= Altos de Jalisco =

Region of Jalisco, Mexico

Los Altos de Jalisco Jaliscan Highlands
- Region of Mexico
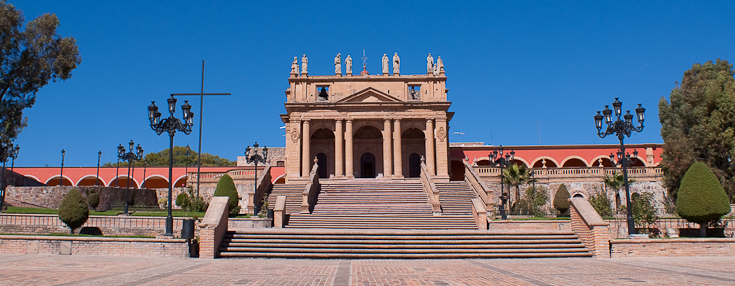
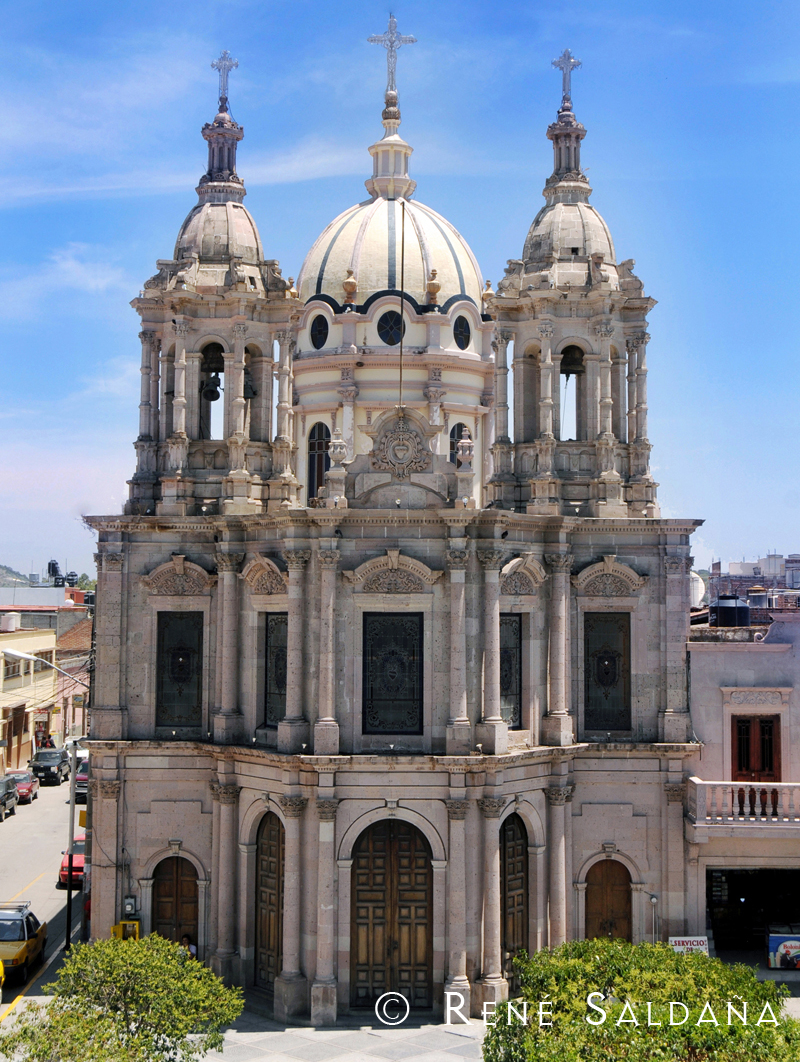
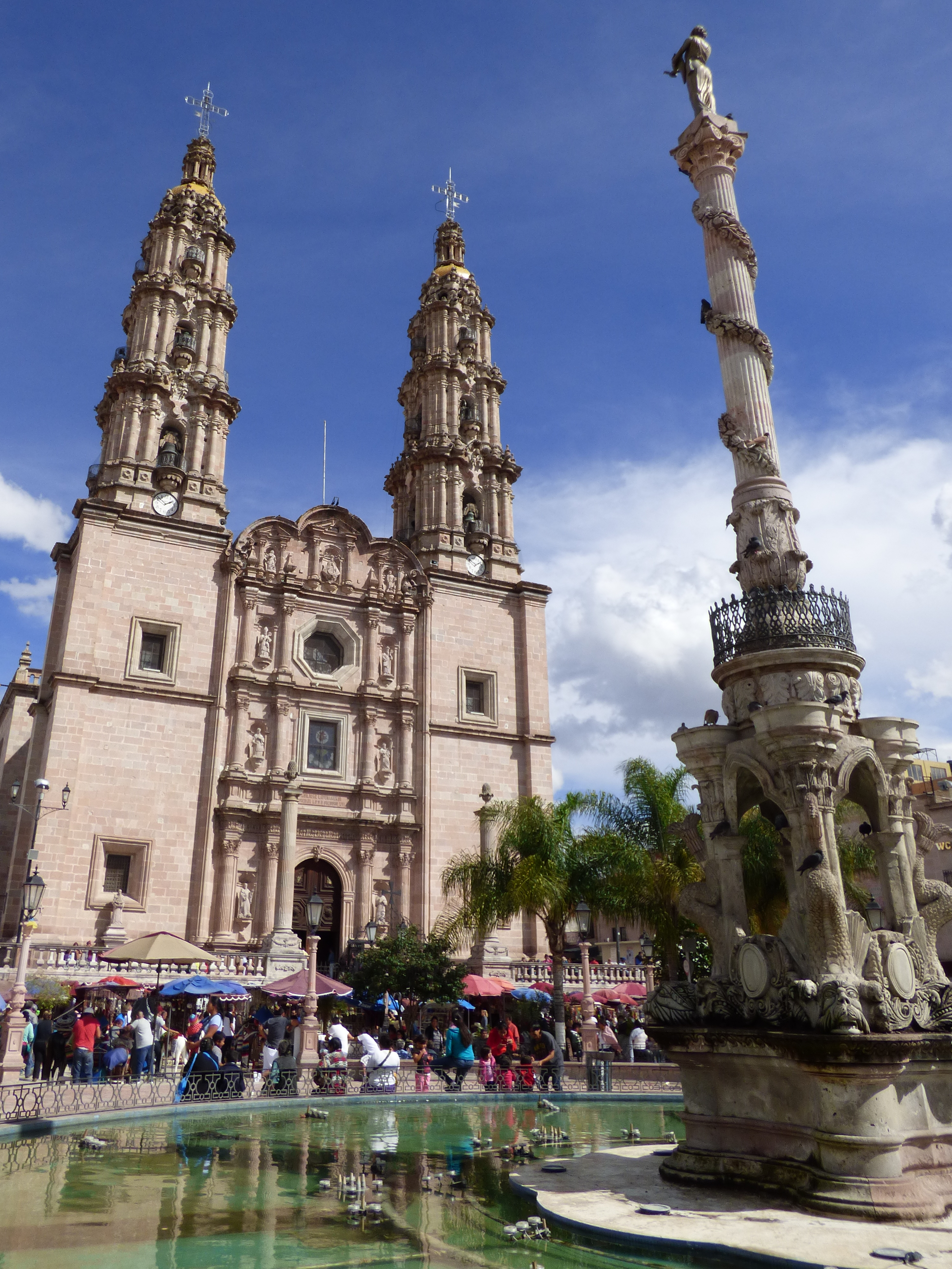
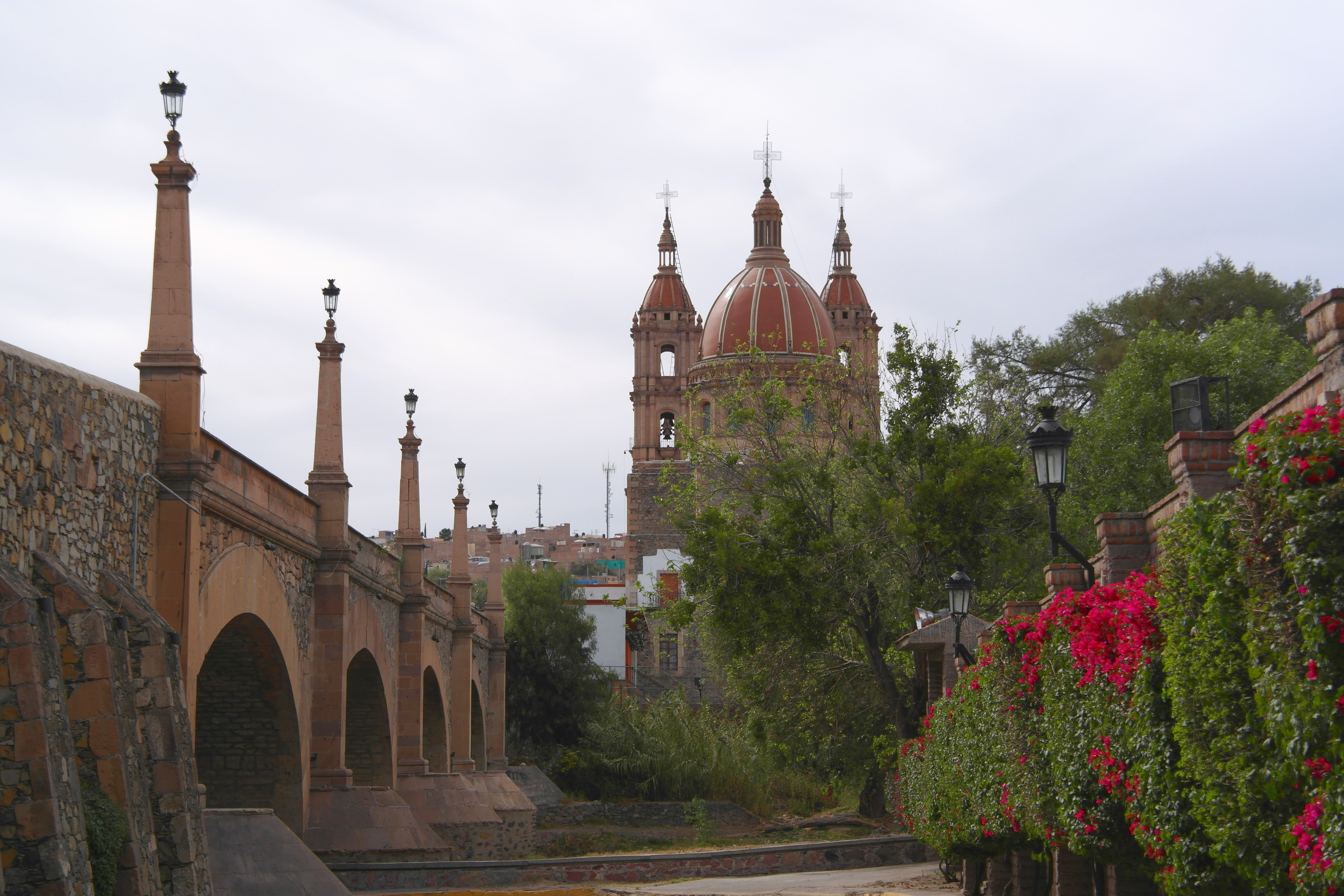
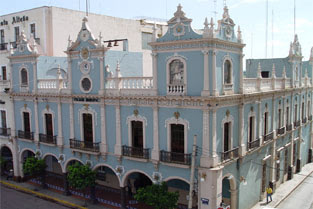
- Clockwise: Lagos de Moreno, San Juan de los Lagos, Tepatitlán de Morelos, Lagos de Moreno, Jalostotitlán

- Coordinates: 21.17°N 104.41°W
- Country: Mexico
- State: Jalisco
- Largest city: Lagos de Moreno

Population (2010)
  - Total: 925,648
- Demonym(s): Alteño(a); Spanish for 'Highlander'

The Altos de Jalisco, or the Jaliscan Highlands, are a geographic and cultural region in the eastern part of the Mexican state of Jalisco, famed as a bastion of Mexican culture, cradling traditions from tequila production to charrería equestrianism. Los Altos are part of the greater Bajío (Lowlands) region of Mexico.

The Altos are primarily a rural or semi-rural region, known for its towns of historic Mexican colonial architecture, deep Catholic conservatism, and numerous Mexican traditions such as equestrianism, mariachi music, tequila production, and traditional Mexican dances and festivals. A significant portion of the population consists of Mexicans of European descent, primarily from the criollos of Castilian, Extremaduran, Galician, Basque, and Andalusian origin but also from early Portuguese, Italian, and Sephardic Jewish settlers and later immigrants from other parts of Europe.

== History ==
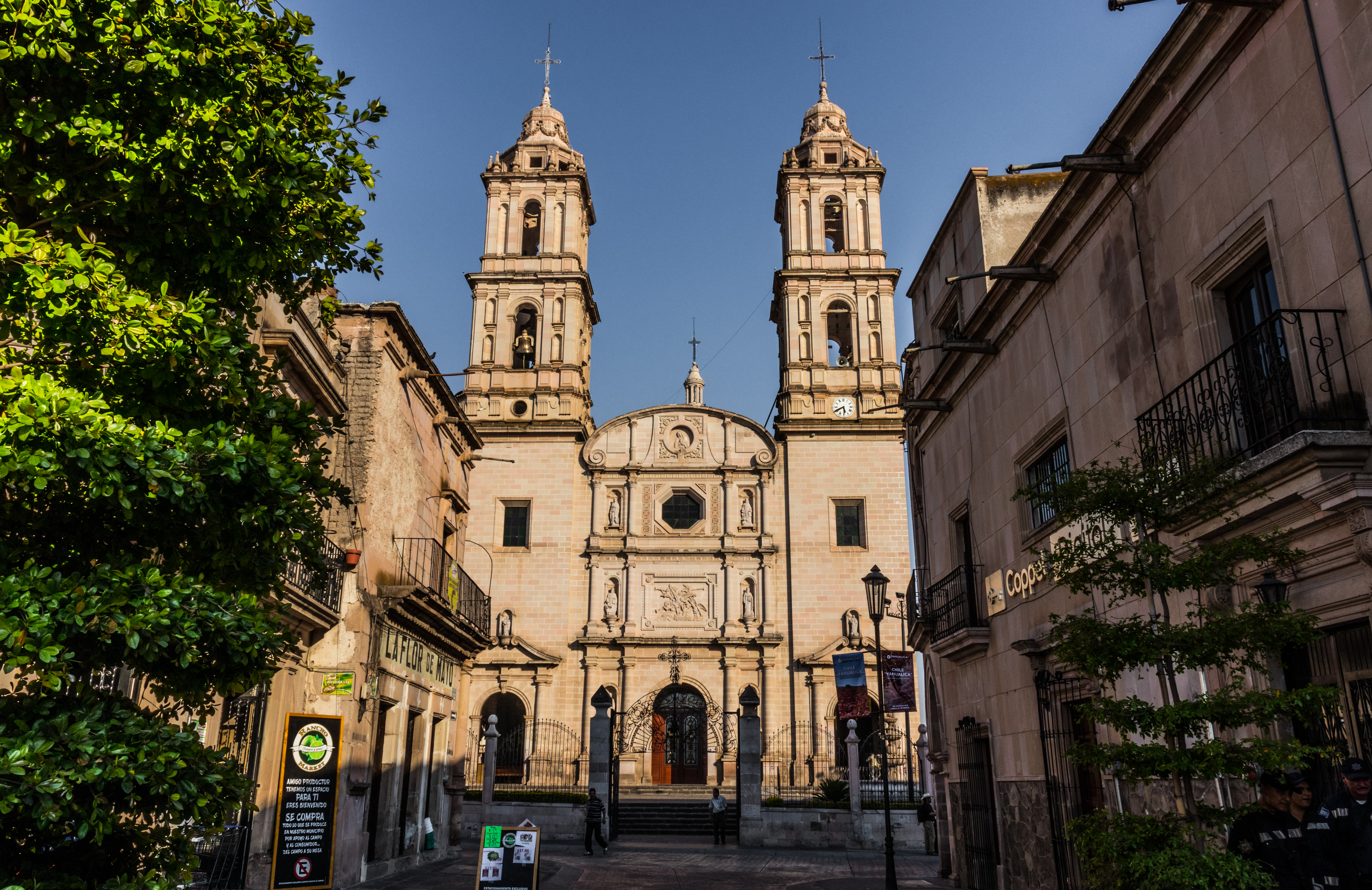
Yahualica de González Gallo, the parish dates from 1542.

The region's native inhabitants, the many Chichimeca nations, were gradually eliminated or accepted in peace accords during the 16th century by Spanish conquistadors led by Captains Hernando Martel and Pedro de Anda, in what is known as the Chichimeca War.

Most of the towns of the Altos were founded by Spanish families during the 16th and 17th centuries. The population today still retains those early indigenous and Spanish roots, and it is intriguing among other things for its increased European appearance due to the strong early Iberian presence and alleged later European migrations, although the latter aren't as strongly supported by historical evidence.

The big Spanish casualties due to the strong Chichimeca response during the Mixtón War led the Spanish to implement a stronger genocidal tactic, together with the fact that the land was a strategic region between the recently discovered silver mines of Zacatecas and Guanajuato. It's said that they took to the Altos de Jalisco experimented European militias who had fought in the Iberian reconquest, as well as soldiers from the greater Holy Roman Empire, which together with the greater Holy League was at war with the Ottoman Empire in Eastern Europe. Their descendants allegedly still inhabit El Bajío intermixed with the remaining Chichimeca and migrating natives from other parts of Mexico (e.g. the Tlaxcaltec and the Totonac) who also helped the Spanish in their campaigns.

Other sources also theorize that the Altos de Jalisco originated as a Sephardic Jewish community in the region during colonial times. Others claim that at the end of the French invasion of Mexico during the 1860s some French forces stayed in the obscured areas of Los Altos and its surroundings, increasing the proportion of European-looking people in the states of Jalisco, Guanajuato and Aguascalientes. It should also be noted that the direct surroundings (the state of Guanajuato, the city of Guadalajara, etc.) are known to have received Spanish, Occitan and Polish immigrants during events such as the Spanish Civil War and World War II.

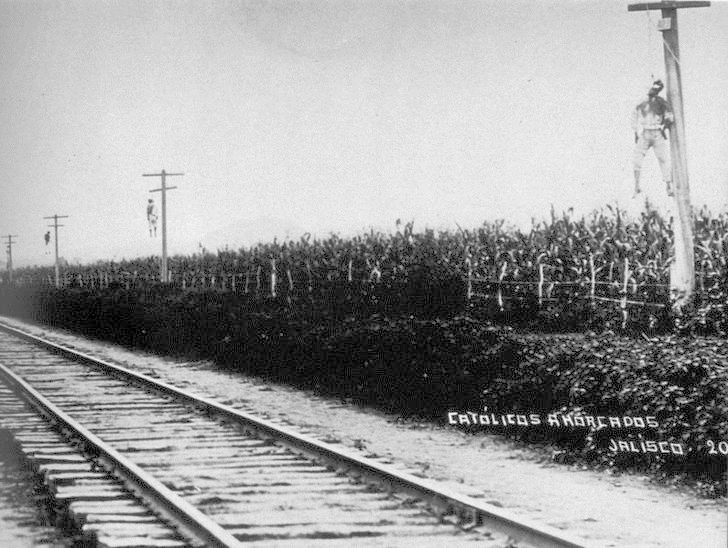
Cristeros executed and hanged by the Mexican government, on display in a railway at the state of Jalisco, 1927.

Los Altos was one of the main scenarios of the Cristero War during the early 20th century, which confronted Catholic peasants and Catholic elites against the anti-clerical government of President Plutarco Calles. The confrontation still is strongly remembered and plays an important role for the cultural identity of Los Altos.

== Culture ==
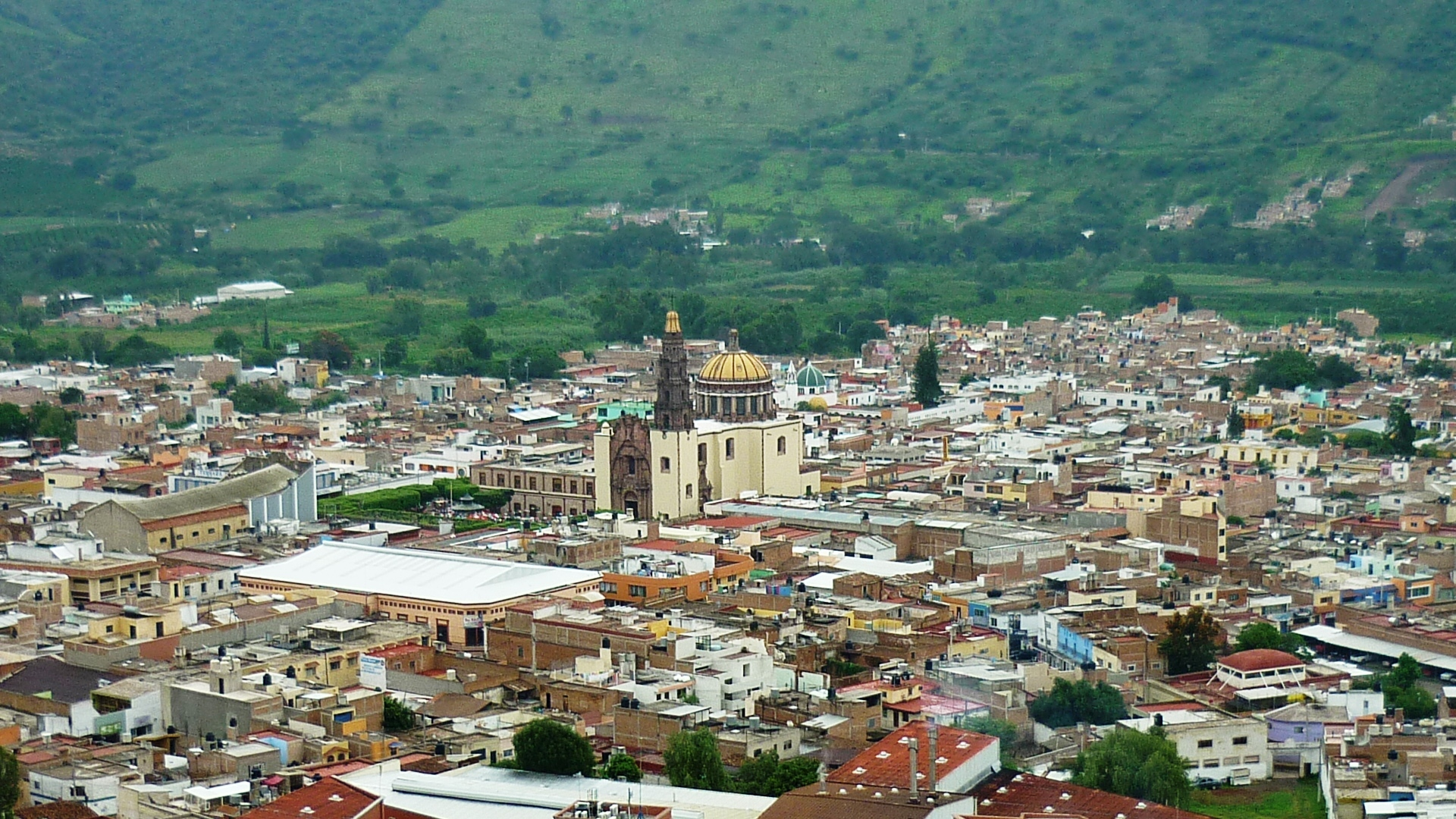
Summer landscape at Atotonilco el Alto.

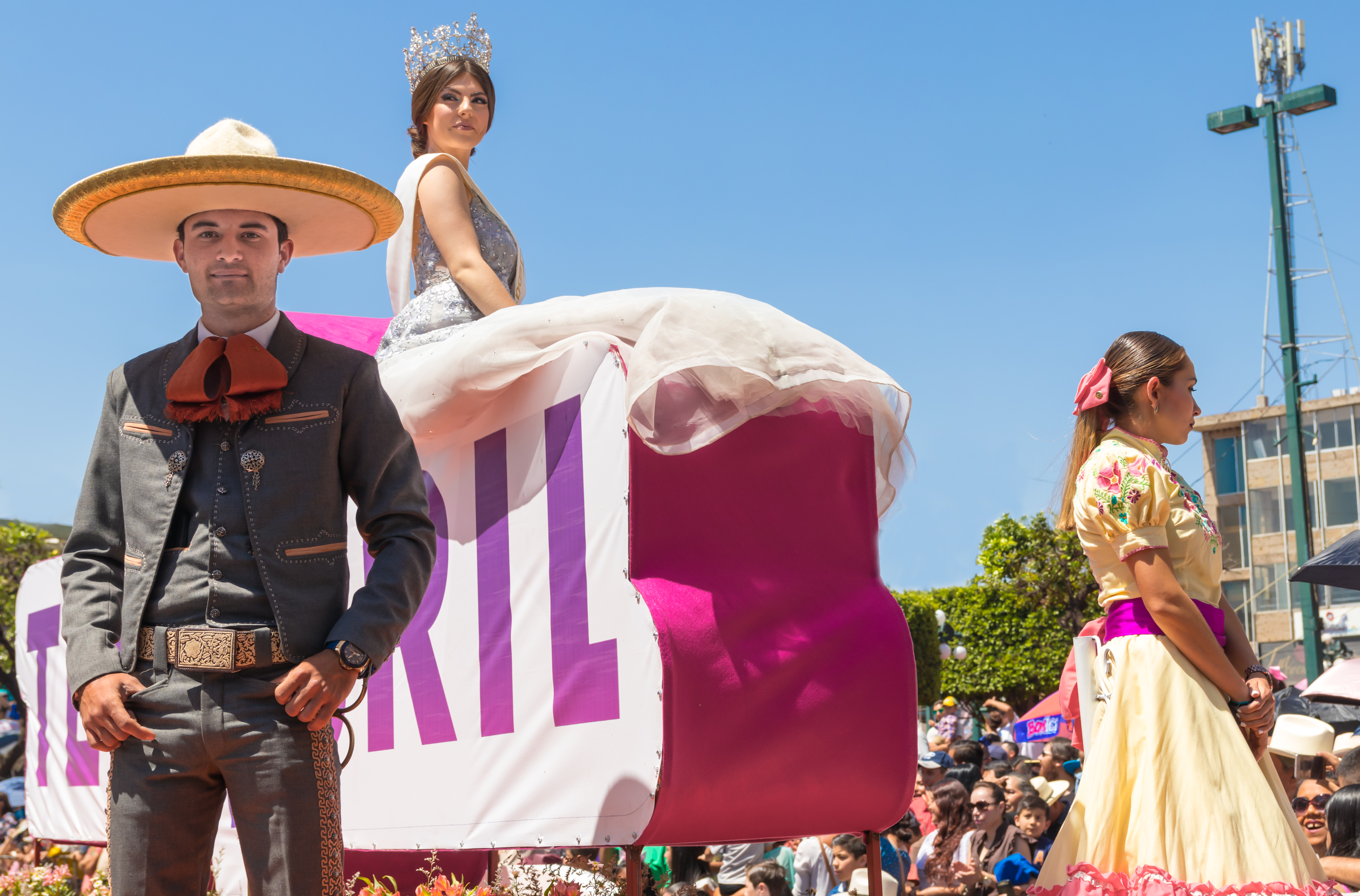
Inhabitants of Tepatitlán wearing traditional attires for a parade.

Annual local festival at Jalostotitlán.

=== Tequila ===
The Altos are one of the two main tequila producing regions in the state of Jalisco, the other being the municipality of Tequila, Jalisco. The main tequila producing center in the region is Arandas and the second region is Atotonilco El Alto.

=== Charro ===
Jalisco's charro tradition is particularly strong in Los Altos. In Spain, a charro is a native of the province of Salamanca, especially in the area of Alba de Tormes, Vitigudino, Ciudad Rodrigo and Ledesma. It is likely that the Mexican charro tradition derived from Spanish horsemen who came from Salamanca and settled in Los Altos de Jalisco.

=== Architecture of Los Altos ===
Some of Los Altos’ older architectural structures, both Pre-Hispanic and colonial, have been designated Pueblo Mágico or National Patrimony protected by Mexico's INAH for their historical, cultural or artistic significance. Lagos de Moreno is only one city in Los Altos de Jalisco on the lists of Pueblo Mágicos. The architecture in Los Altos is heavy influenced by European architects during the Spanish Colonial to early WWI era.

=== Pilgrimage ===
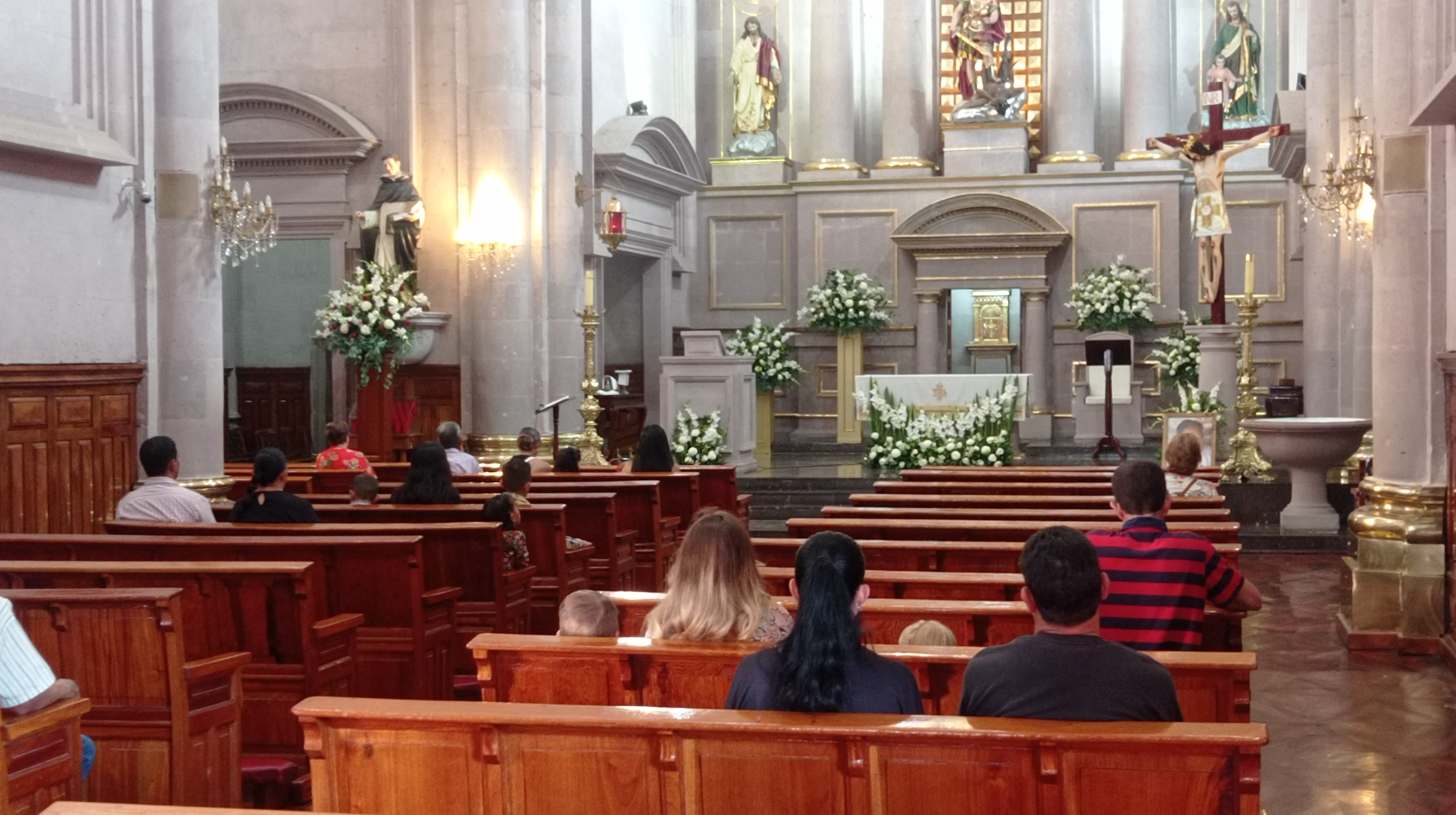
People attending Catholic mass in San Miguel el Alto.

Los Altos have many shrines. San Juan de los Lagos is the second most visited pilgrimage shrine of the Catholic Church in Mexico, after the Basilica of Our Lady of Guadalupe in Mexico City . The numerous shrines are important tourist attractions for the state of Jalisco:

- Our Lady of San Juan de los Lagos, in San Juan de los Lagos.
- Our Lady of the Assumption, in Jalostotitlán.
- Martyred Saint Toribio Romo González, in Santa Ana de Guadalupe, municipal of Jalostotitlán.
- Martyred Blessed Anacleto González Flores in Tepatitlan de Morelos.
- Martyred Blessed Miguel Gomez Loza in San Francisco de Asis, municipal of Atotonilco el Alto.
- Martyred Saint Julio Alvarez Mendoz in San Julian, Jalisco.
- Martyred Saint Atilano Cruz-Alvarado in Teocaltiche.
- Venerable Mother Maria Luisa Josefa of the Most Blessed Sacrament in Atotonilco El Alto.
- Martyred Saint Pedro Esqueda Ramírez in Teocaltitán, municipal of Jalostotitlán.
- Martyred Saint Sabás Reyes Salazar in Tototlan.
- Martyred Blessed Don Aurelio De La Torre in Tototlan.
- Holy Child of the Little Peanut (Santo Niño del Cacahuatito) in Mezquitic de la Magdalena in municipal of San Juan de los Lagos.

Zapotlanejo

- Nuestra señora la virgen del Rosario.

== Administration ==
Since 1996, Los Altos has been organized administratively by the state of Jalisco into two regions, the North Highlands (Altos Norte) and the South Highlands (Altos Sur).

=== North ===
The North Highlands (Altos Norte) region covers 8,882 km², which represents 11% of the state's territory. The municipalities in the region are the following:

- Encarnación de Díaz
- Lagos de Moreno
- Ojuelos de Jalisco
- San Diego de Alejandría
- San Juan de los Lagos
- Teocaltiche
- Unión de San Antonio
- Villa Hidalgo

Lagos de Moreno is the municipality seat of the North Highlands. In this region, factories develop clothing, furniture, footwear, metal goods, sweets and jams. Some of the municipalities in this region have a very important livestock activity mainly in the production of dairy products.

=== South ===
The South Highlands (Altos Sur) region has 6,667 km², which is 5% of the state's surface. The municipalities of this region are the following:

- Acatic
- Arandas
- Cañadas de Obregón
- Jalostotitlán
- Jesús María
- Mexticacán
- San Julián
- San Miguel el Alto
- Tepatitlán de Morelos
- Valle de Guadalupe
- Yahualica de González Gallo
- San Ignacio Cerro Gordo
- Capilla de Guadalupe
- Zapotlanejo, Puerta de Los Altos

Tepatitlán de Morelos is the municipality seat of the South Highlands. In this region is the most recent municipality of the State, San Ignacio Cerro Gordo, which was separated from Arandas. Traditionally Atotonilco el Alto, Ayotlán, Tototlán and Degollado belong to this southern zone of Los Altos. In general, the region has the production of tequila and the development of livestock, clothing, and various crafts.

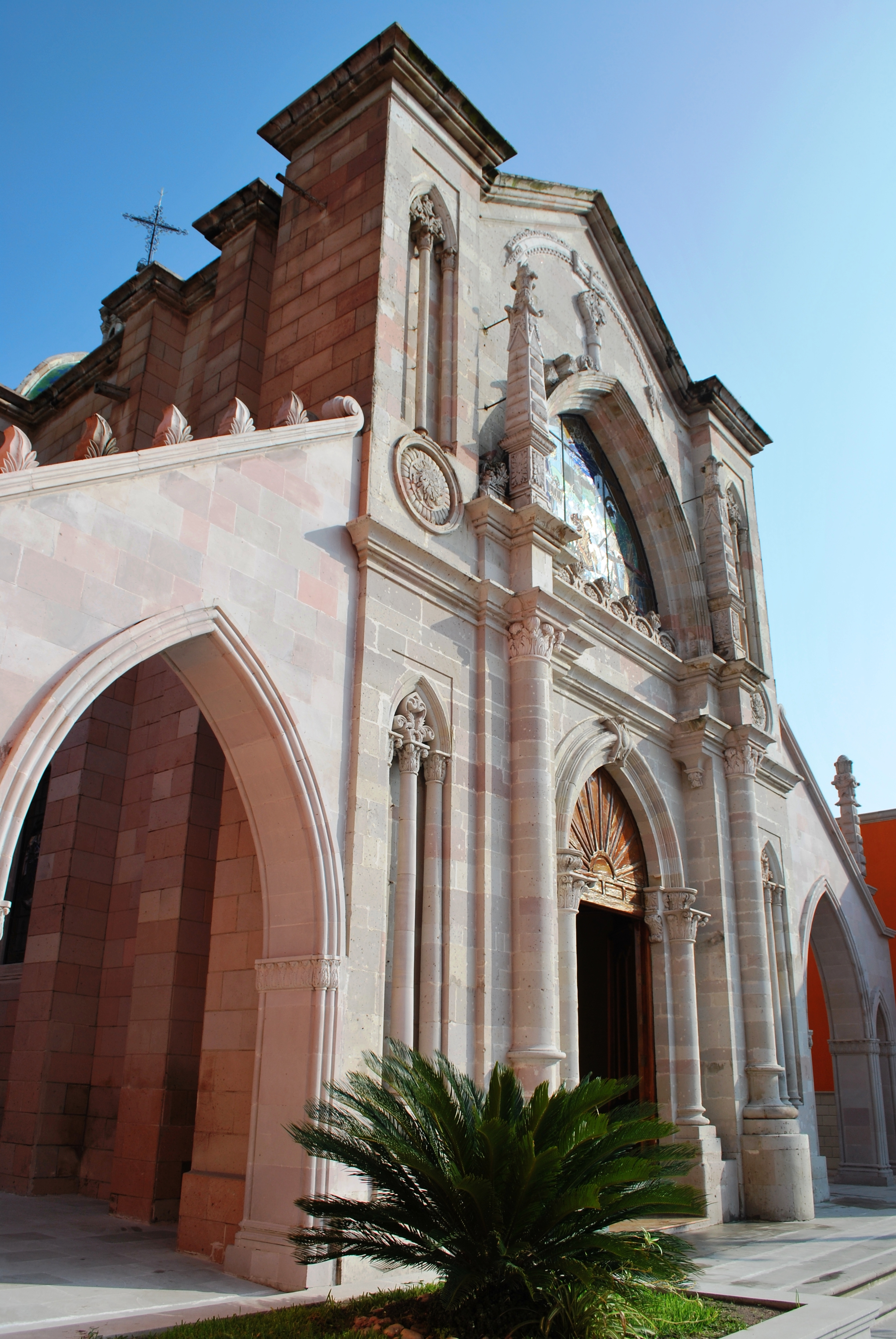
San Juan de Los Lagos.

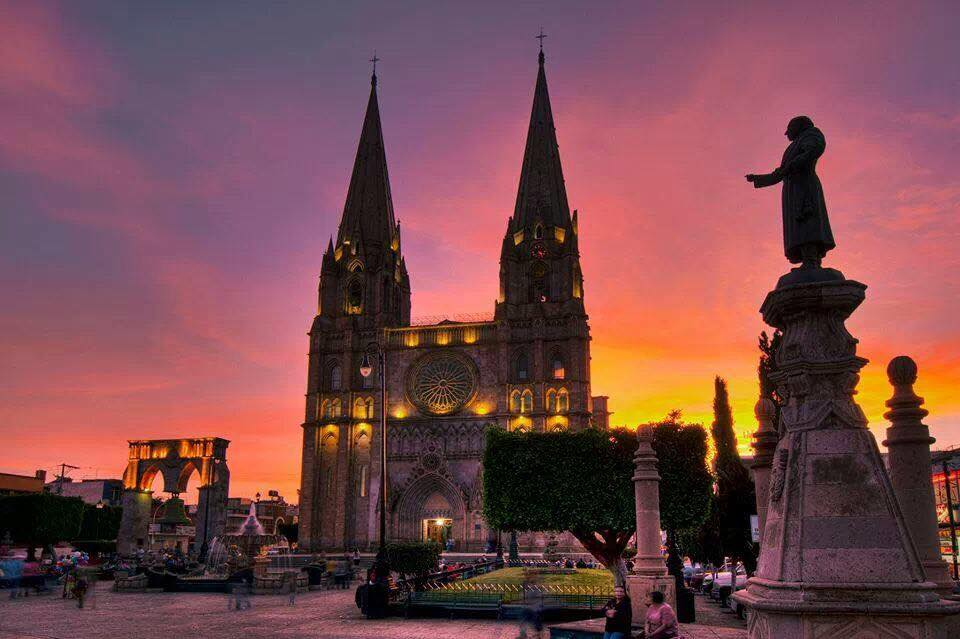
Arandas.

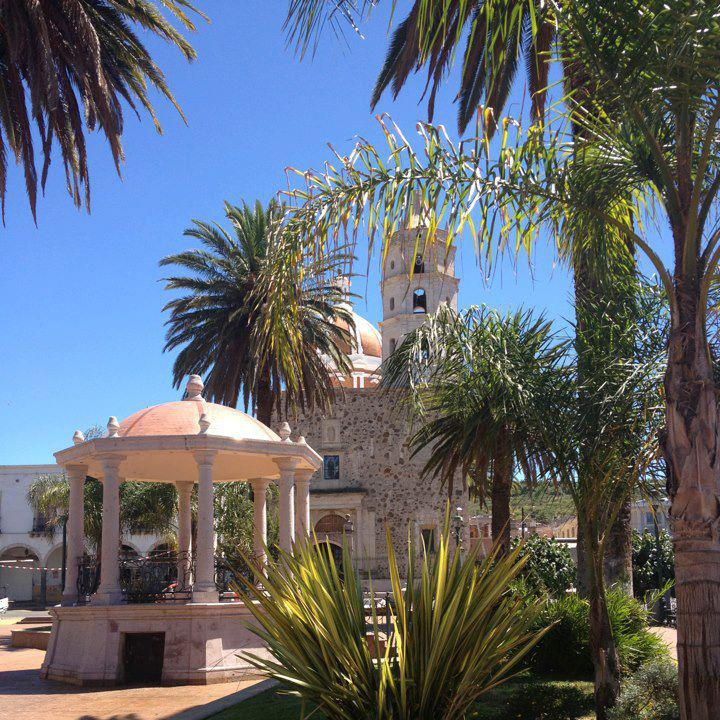
Valle de Guadalupe.

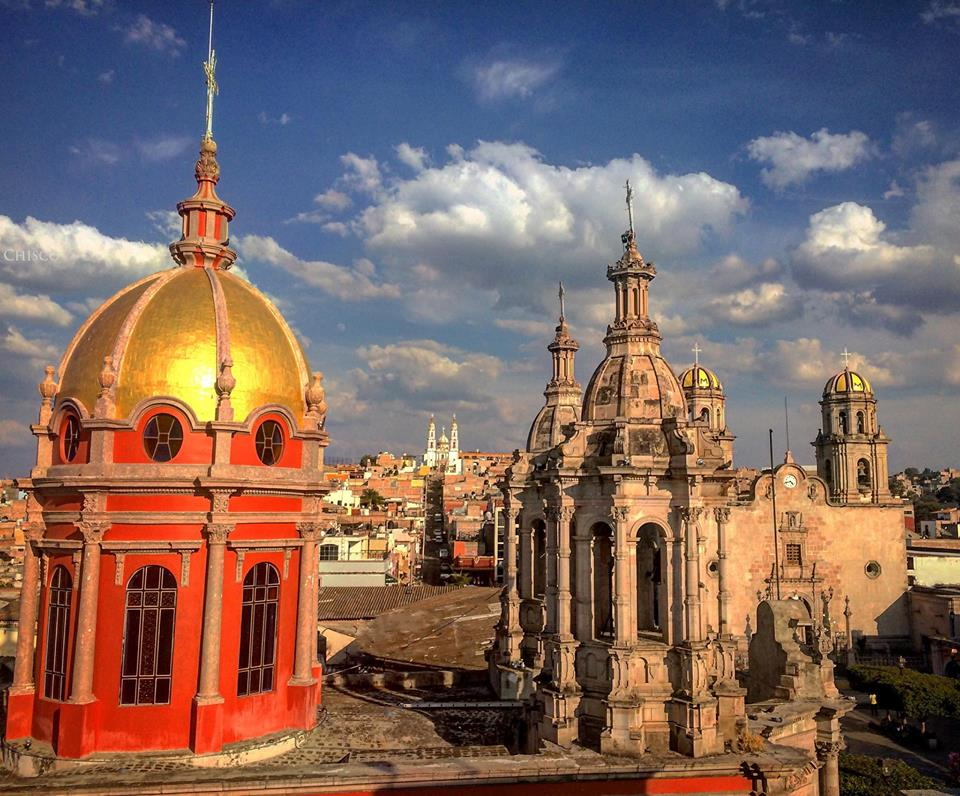
Jalostotitlán.

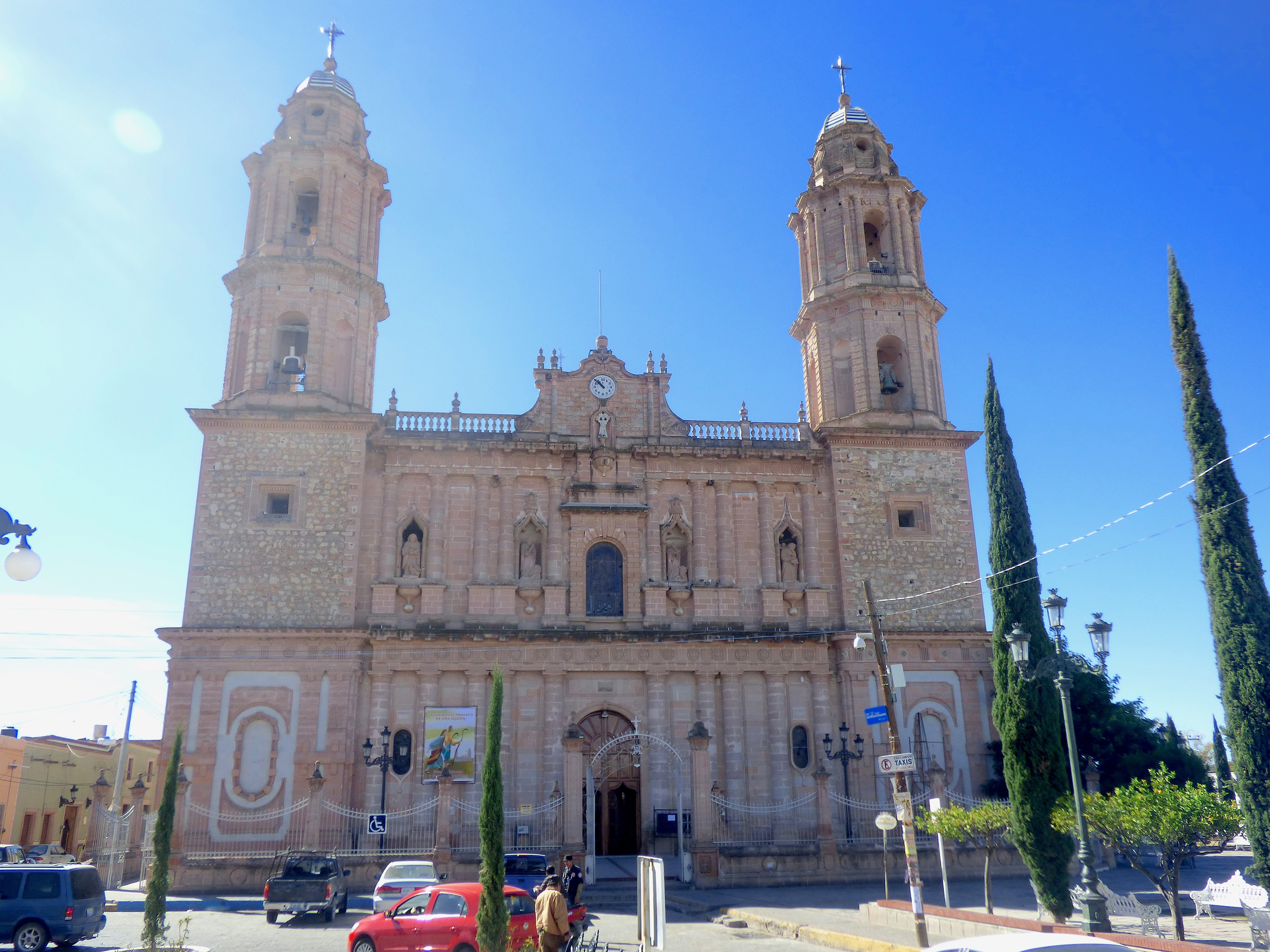
Teocaltiche.

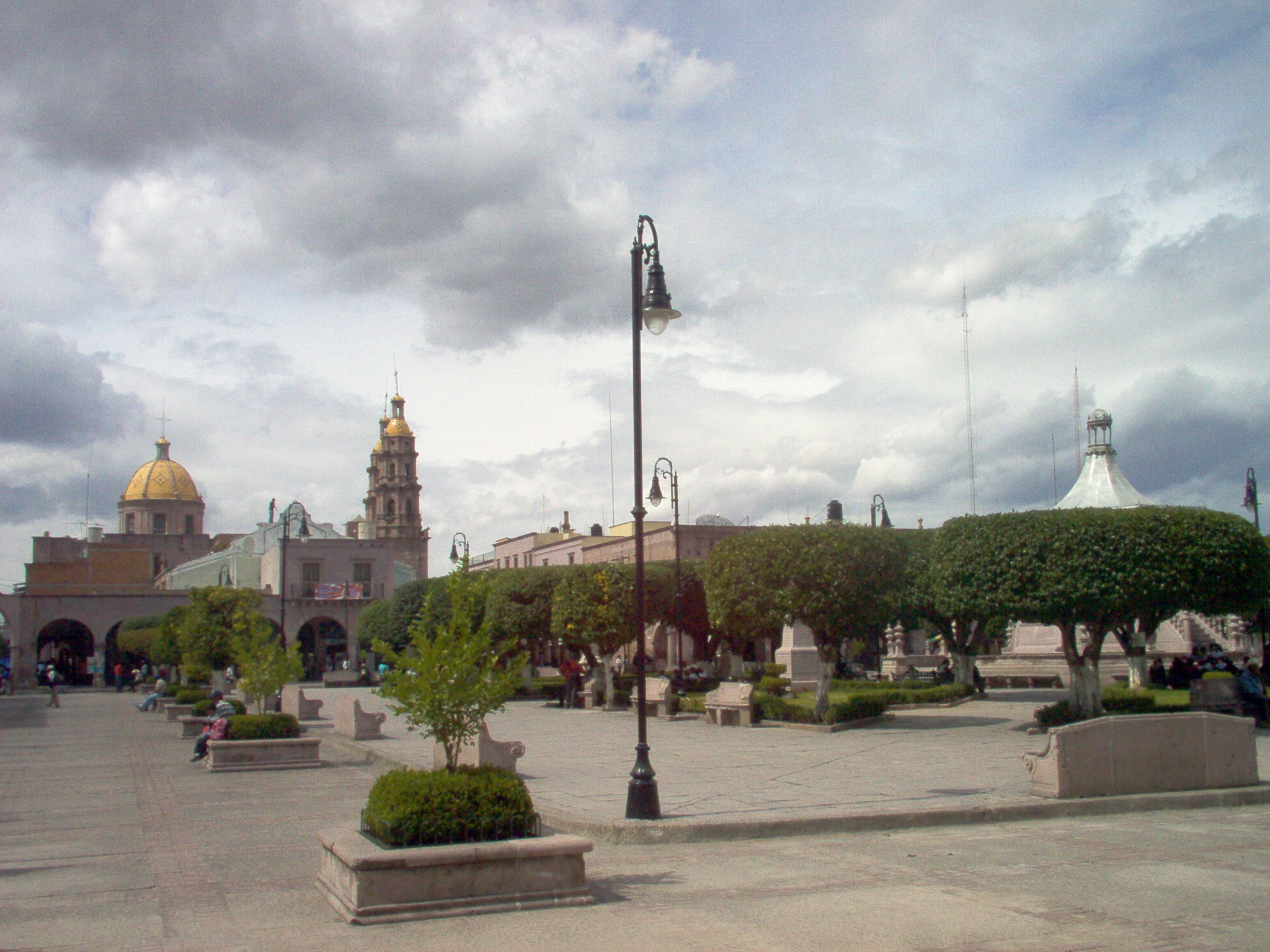
San Miguel el Alto.

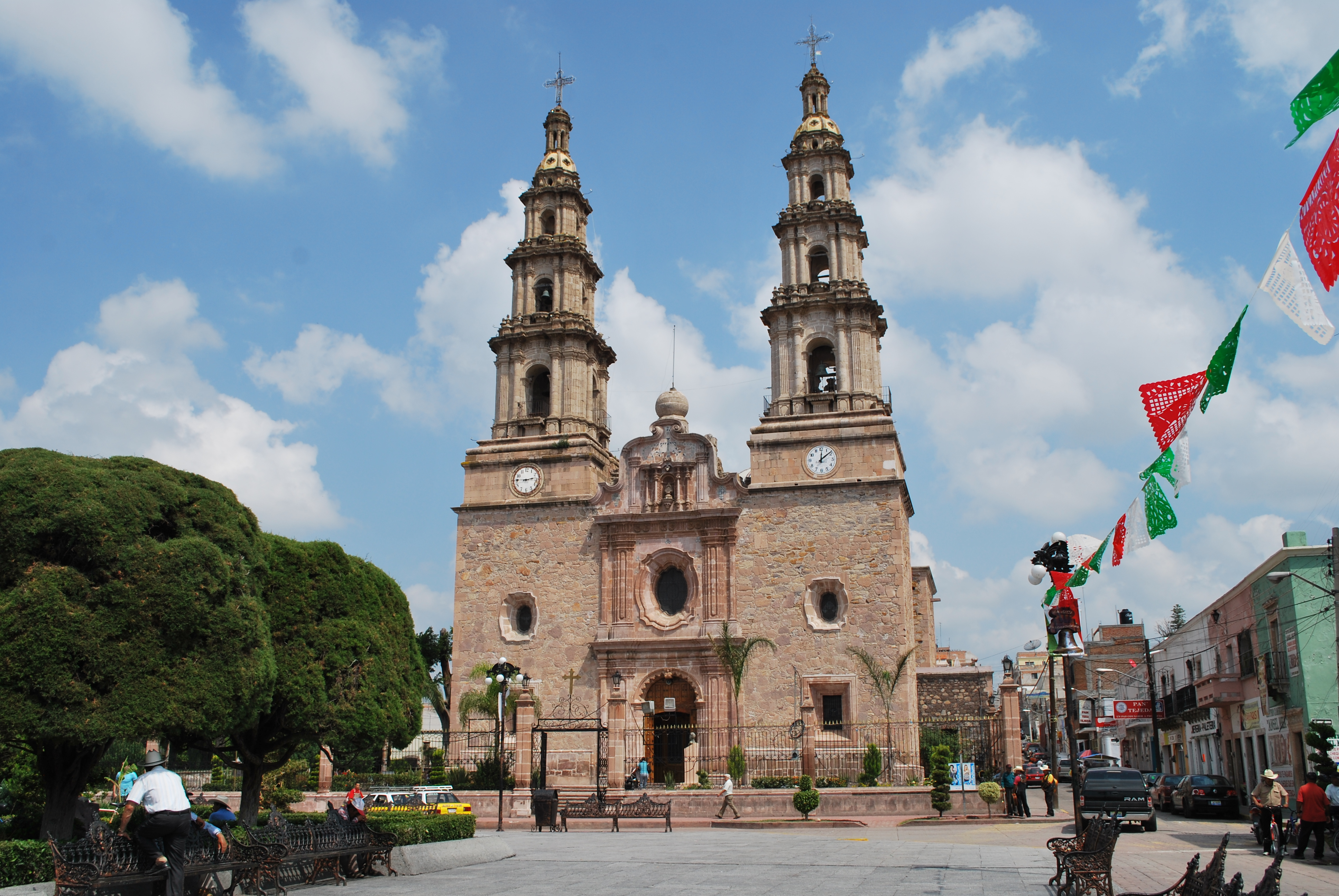
Encarnación de Díaz.

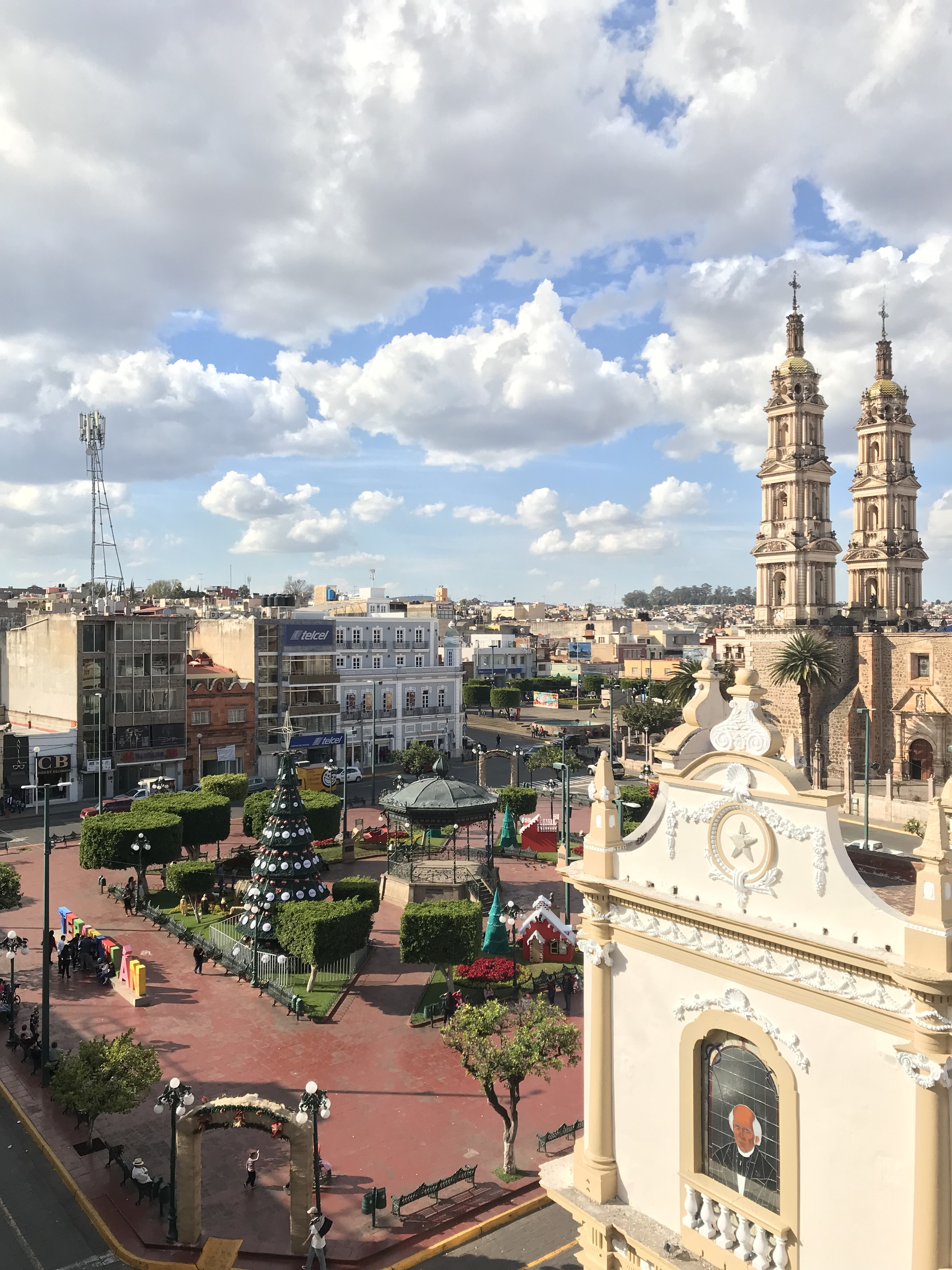
Tepatitlán de Morelos.

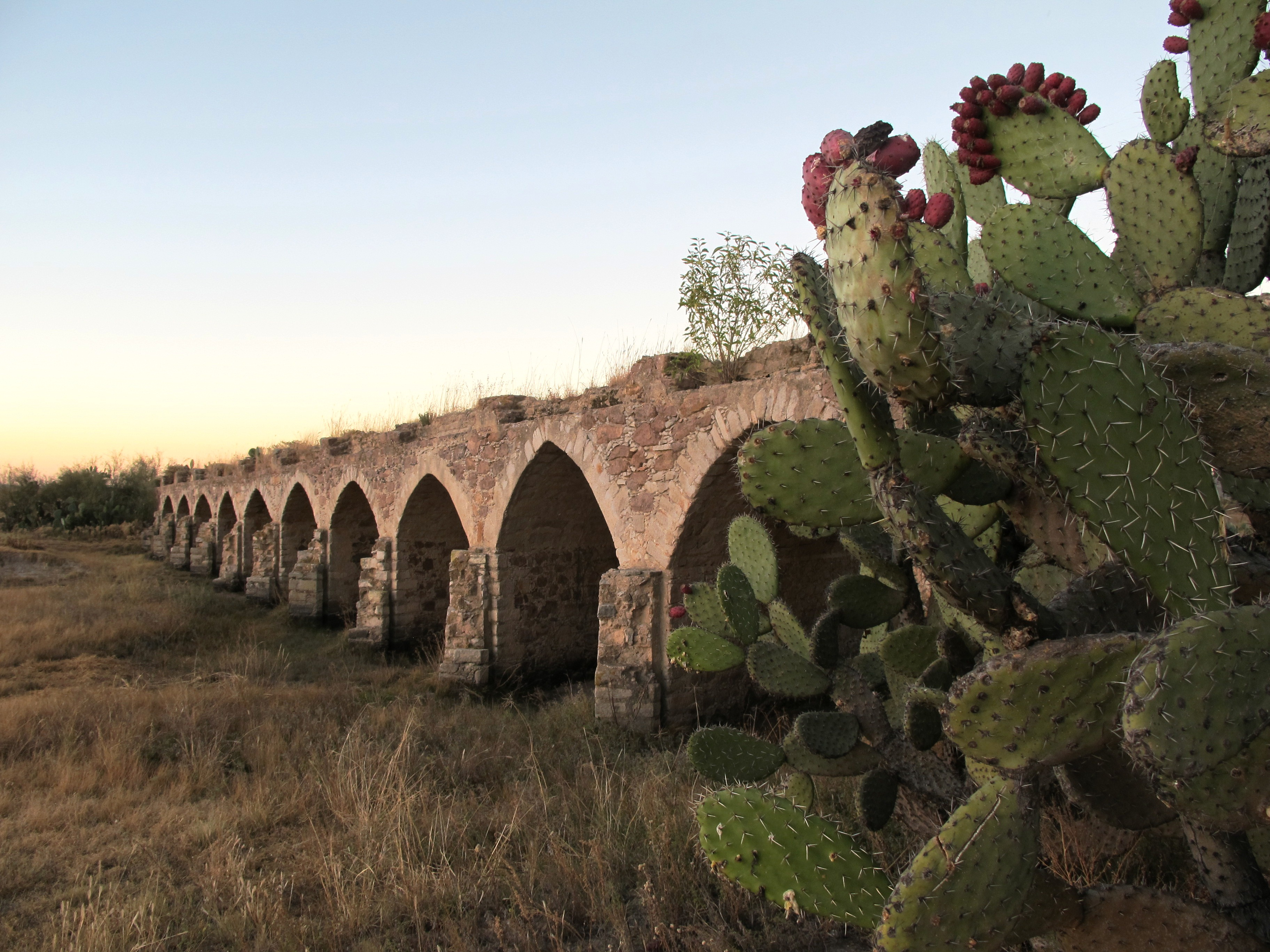
Ojuelos.

== Notable Alteños ==
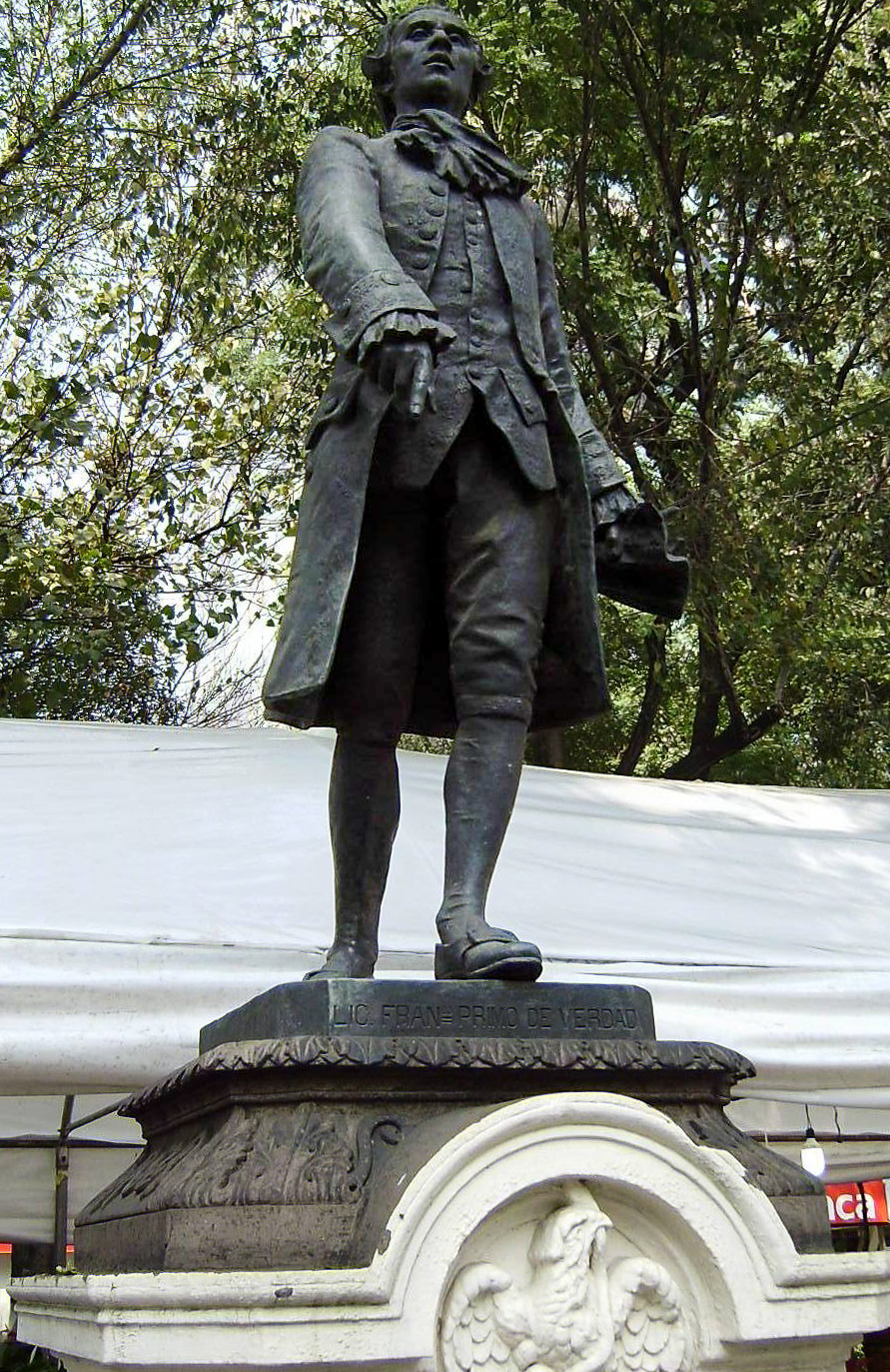
Monument to Primo de Verdad in Mexico City, lawyer and prominent intellectual author of Mexican Independence.

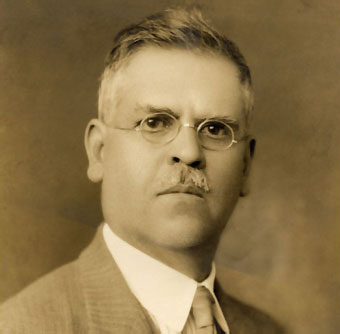
Mariano Azuela, physician and novelist of the Mexican Revolution.

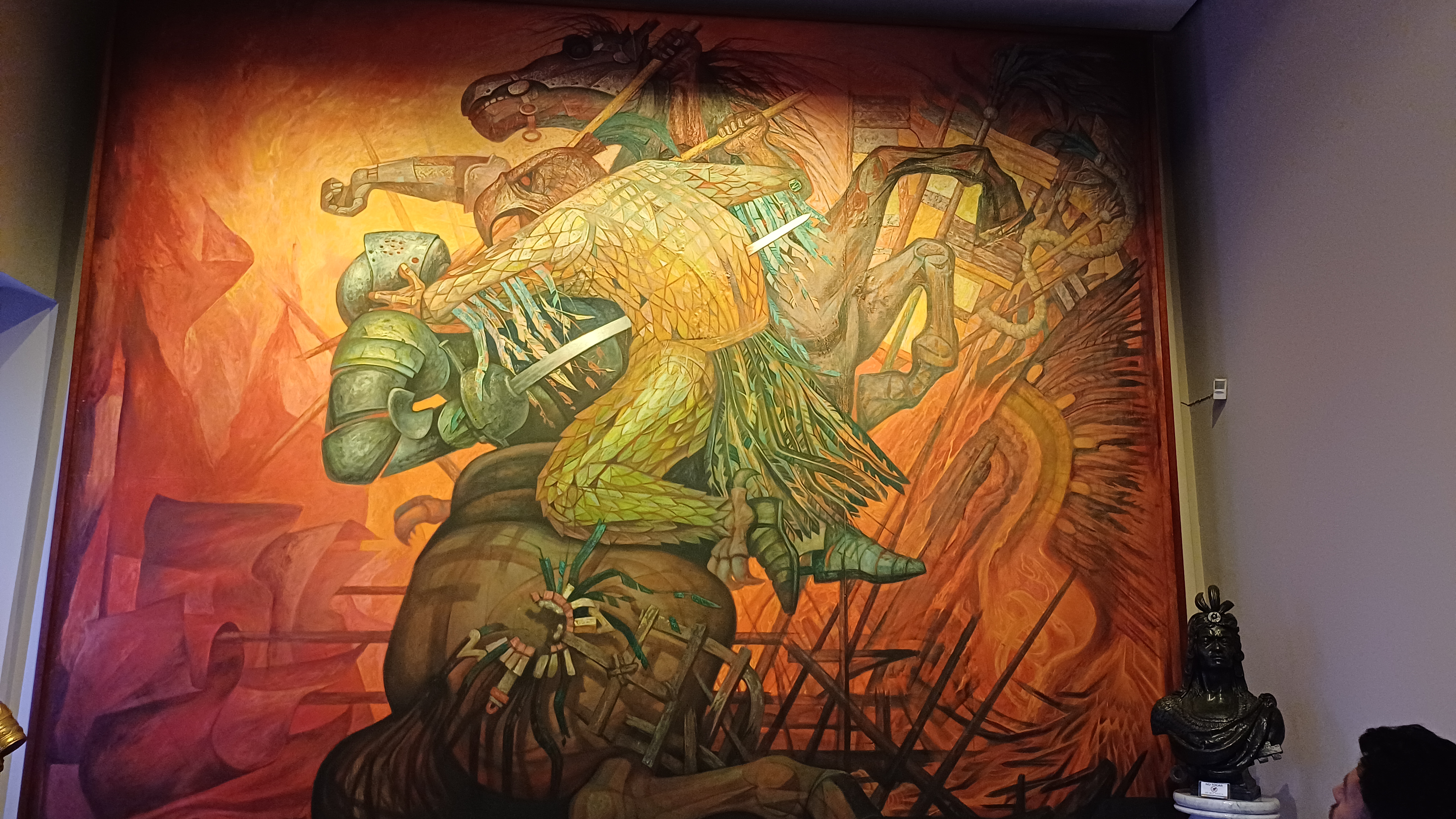
Mural by painter Jorge González Camarena.

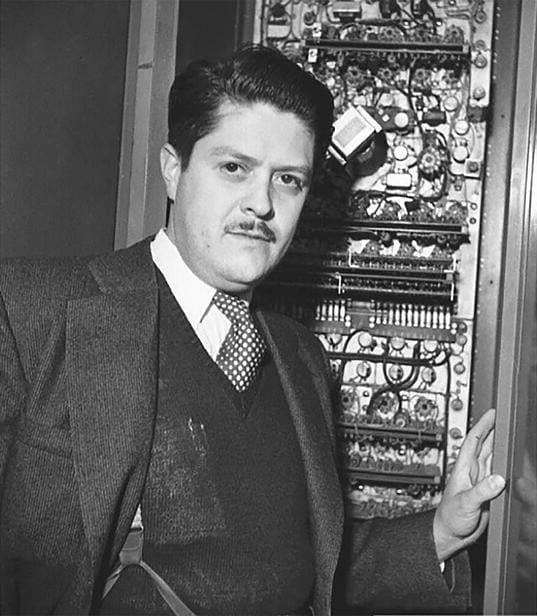
Electrical engineer and color TV pioneer, Guillermo Gonález Camarena.

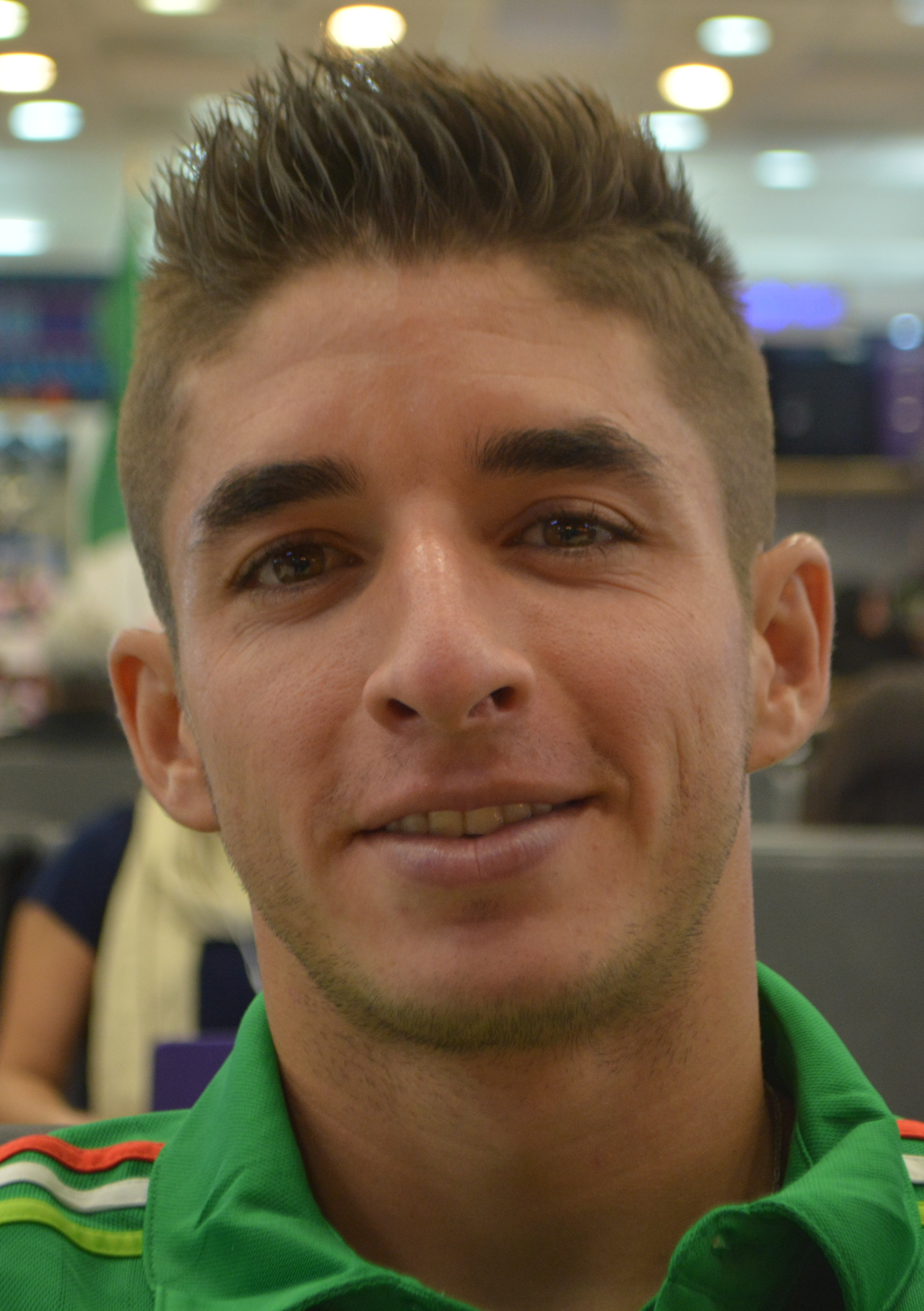
Professional footballer Isaac Brizuela (born in San José, California to Alteño parents).

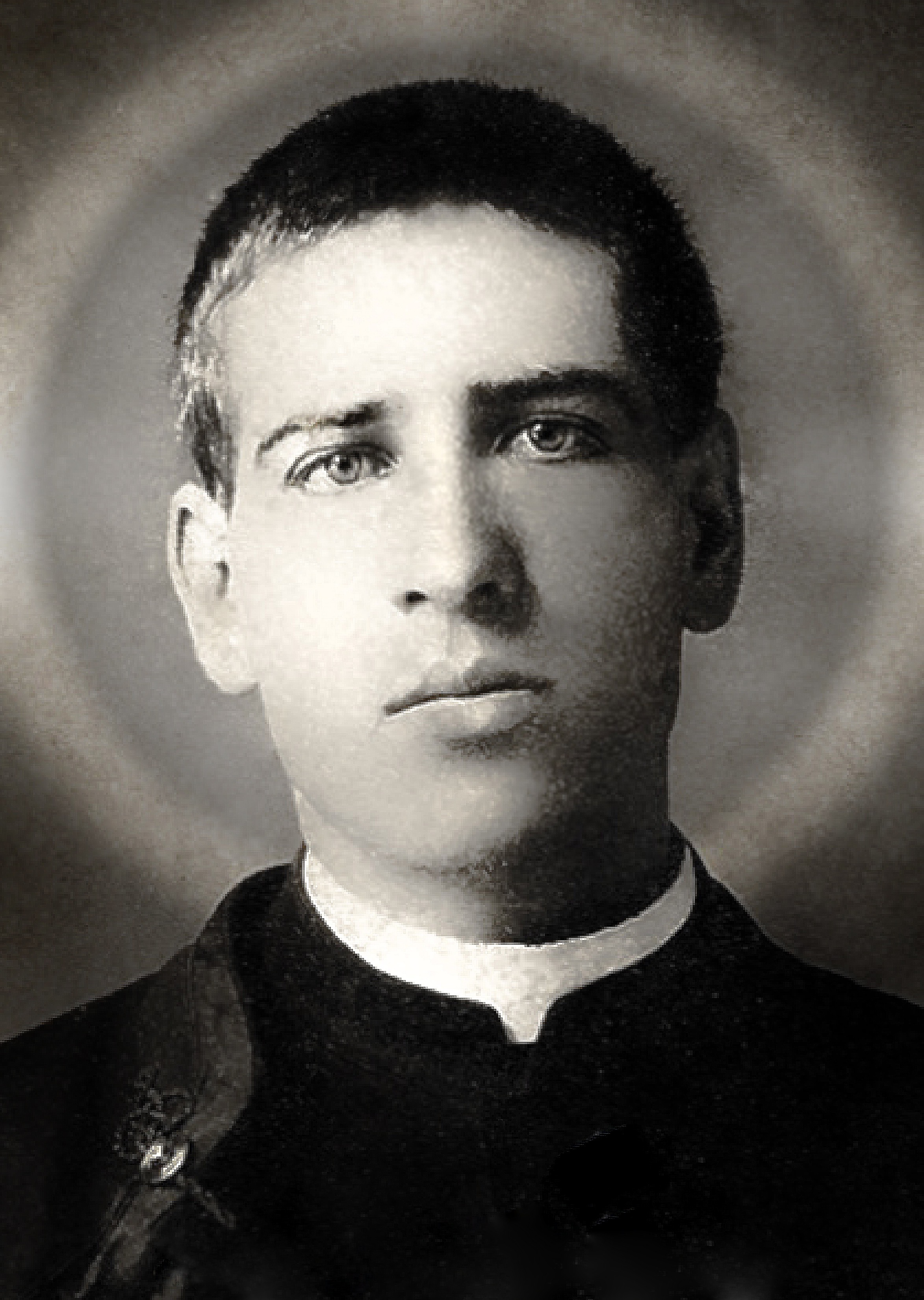
Toribio Romo, martyr and Catholic saint.

=== Politics ===
- Luis Alfonso de Alba Góngora, Mexican under-secretary for Latin America in the Secretary of Foreign Relations, former Mexican Representative to the United Nations (Lagos de Moreno)
- Ramón Muñoz Gutiérrez, Senator of Jalisco in the Mexican Senate of the Republic (Lagos de Moreno)
- Emilio González Márquez, former Governor of Jalisco (Lagos de Moreno)
- Pedro Moreno, general and father of the Mexican War of Independence (Lagos de Moreno)
- Francisco Primo de Verdad y Ramos, 18th-century lawyer and politician of colonial New Spain (Ojuelos de Jalisco)
- Victoriano Ramírez, Mexican general of the Cristero War (San Miguel el Alto).
- José González Gallo, Mexican lawyer and politician who served as Governor of Jalisco (Yahualica de González Gallo).
- Rita Pérez de Moreno, Mexican insurgent and heroine of the Mexican War of Independence (San Juan de los Lagos).

=== Culture ===
- Lola Álvarez Bravo, famed photographer, prominent figure of the post-Mexican Revolution artistic renaissance
- Juan Pablo Villalobos, author and entrepreneur
- José Rosas Moreno, 19th-century writer, fableist, and poet
- Mariano Azuela González, 19th/20th-century literary critic, novelist, and essayist
- Jorge González Camarena, Mexican painter, muralist and sculptor, his parents were originally from Arandas.
- Guillermo González Camarena, Mexican electrical engineer who was the inventor of a color-wheel type of color television, brother of Jorge. (father from Arandas)
- Juan Sandoval Íñiguez, Mexican cardinal of the Roman Catholic Church, and served as Archbishop of Guadalajara.
- Alan Estrada, Mexican actor, dancer and singer.

=== Athletics ===
- Luis Fernando Macías, professional cyclist, silver medalist at the 2009 Pan-American Road and Track Championship
- Armando Reynoso Gutiérrez, baseball player for the Mexico national team, Mexican Baseball Hall of Fame member
- Isaác Brizuela Muñoz, Mexican-American footballer for C.D. Guadalajara
- Carmelo Reyes González, former professional wrestler
- J. Paco Gonzalez, Mexican-born American Thoroughbred horse racing trainer.
- Antonio Martínez, Mexican-born American professional football player.
- Martín Vásquez, Mexican-American former professional football player and current coach.
- Miguel Angel Gonzalez, Mexican MLB player (Baltimore Orioles, Chicago White Sox, Texas Rangers)
- Martin Barragan, Professional Mexican footballer from Tizapan el Alto who currently plays for Necaxa.
- Brian Gutiérrez, professional soccer player playing for the national Mexican soccer team. Family is from San Juan de los Lagos

== See also ==
- Bajío
- Nueva Galicia
- La Gran Chichimeca
- Camino Real de Tierra Adentro
- Cristero War
- Chichimeca War
- El Salto–La Red–Calderón aqueduct
