= Región Altos Norte, Jalisco =

Altos Norte Region
- Region
- #2-Altos Norte Region
- Country: Mexico
- State: Jalisco
- Largest city: Lagos de Moreno

Area
  - Total: 8,554 km^{2} (3,303 sq mi)

Population (2020)
  - Total: 417,865
- Time zone: UTC−06:00 (Zona Centro)

The Altos Norte region is one of the regions of the Mexican state of Jalisco.. It includes eight municipalities with a population of 417,485 inhabitants as of 2020.

== Municipalities ==
Municipality code	Name	Population		Land Area			Population density	
Municipality code	Name	2020	Rank	km^{2}	sq mi	Rank	2020	Rank
035	Encarnación de Díaz	53,039	3	1,250	480	2	42/km^{2} (110/sq mi)	4
053	Lagos de Moreno	172,403	1	2,797	1,080	1	62/km^{2} (160/sq mi)	2
064	Ojuelos de Jalisco	33,588	5	1,204	465	3	28/km^{2} (72/sq mi)	6
072	San Diego de Alejandría	7,609	8	347	134	8	22/km^{2} (57/sq mi)	8
073	San Juan de los Lagos	72,230	2	914	353	4	79/km^{2} (205/sq mi)	1
091	Teocaltiche	39,839	4	860	330	5	46/km^{2} (120/sq mi)	3
109	Unión de San Antonio	19,069	7	708	273	6	27/km^{2} (70/sq mi)	7
116	Villa Hidalgo	20,088	6	474	183	7	42/km^{2} (110/sq mi)	5
	Altos Norte Region	417,865	—	8,554	3,302.72	—	49/km^{2} (127/sq mi)	—
Source: INEGI

=== Largest cities ===
Largest cities or towns in Altos Norte Region Source:
Rank		Municipality	Pop.
1	Lagos de Moreno	Lagos de Moreno	111,569
2	San Juan de los Lagos	San Juan de los Lagos	53,539
3	Encarnación de Díaz	Encarnación de Díaz	27,833
4	Teocaltiche	Teocaltiche	24,580
5	Villa Hidalgo	Villa Hidalgo	15,594
6	Ojuelos de Jalisco	Ojuelos de Jalisco	14,424
7	Unión de San Antonio	Unión de San Antonio	8,737
8	San Diego de Alejandría	San Diego de Alejandría	6,025
9	Las Pintas	Ojuelos de Jalisco	5,435
10	Geovillas Laureles del Campanario	Lagos de Moreno	4,762
