= 2nd federal electoral district of Jalisco =

Federal electoral district of Mexico

Jalisco's 2nd
- Electoral district of the Chamber of Deputies of Mexico

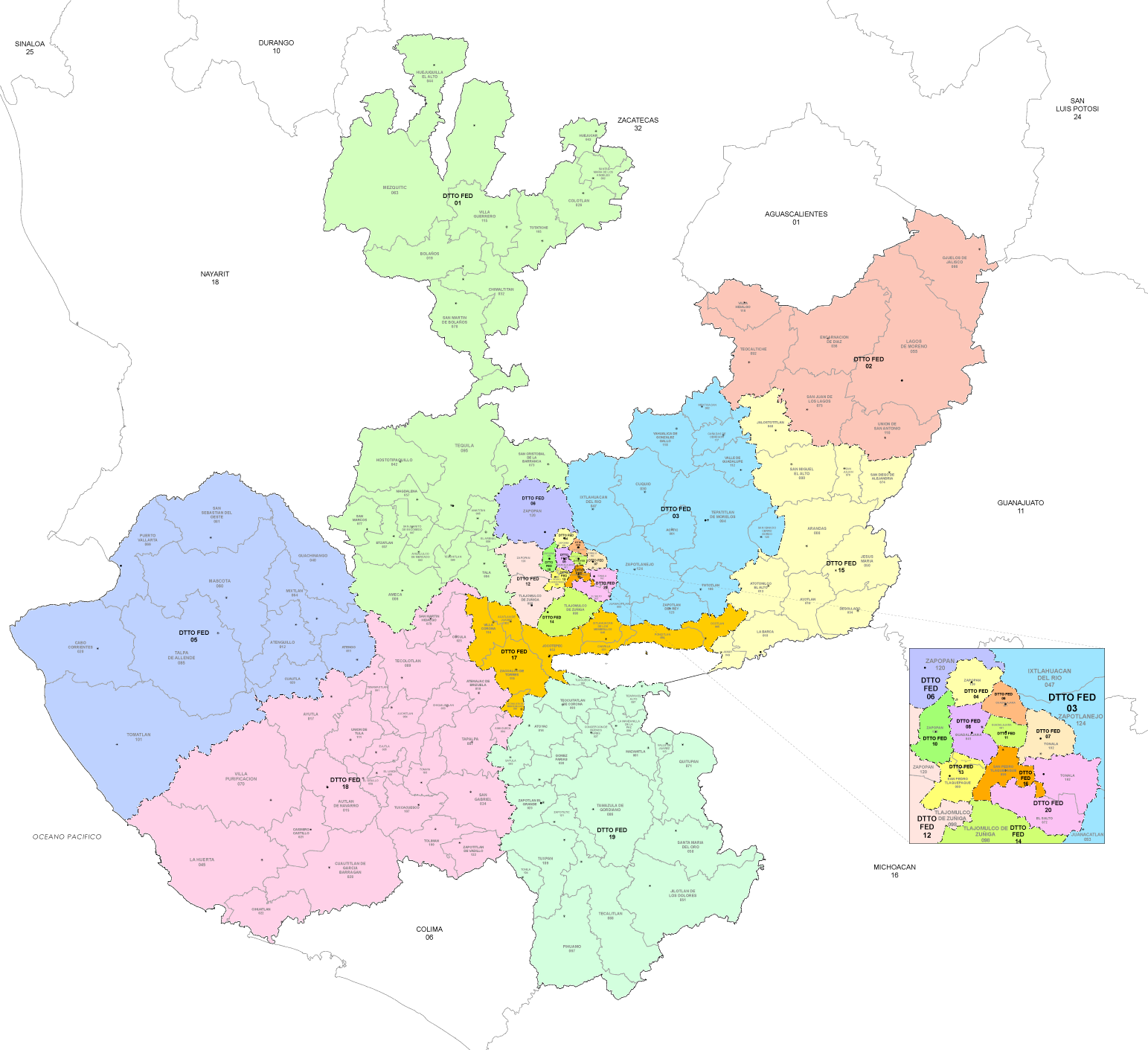
- 2nd district

Incumbent
- Member: Tecutli Gómez Villalobos
- Party: ▌Citizens' Movement
- Congress: 66th (2024–2027)

District
- State: Jalisco
- Head town: Lagos de Moreno
- Coordinates: 21°21′N 101°55′W
- Covers: Encarnación de Díaz, Lagos de Moreno, Ojuelos de Jalisco, San Juan de los Lagos, Teocaltiche, Unión de San Antonio, Villa Hidalgo
- PR region: First
- Precincts: 202
- Population: 410,252 (2020 census)

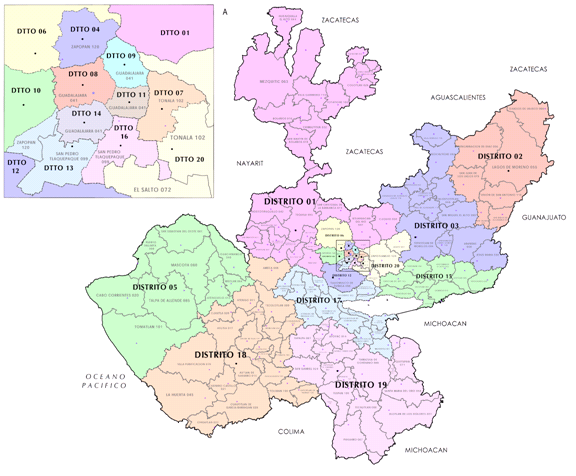
Jalisco's districts in 2017–2022

The 2nd federal electoral district of Jalisco (Spanish: Distrito electoral federal 02 de Jalisco) is one of the 300 electoral districts into which Mexico is divided for elections to the federal Chamber of Deputies and one of 20 such districts in the state of Jalisco.

It elects one deputy to the lower house of Congress for each three-year legislative session by means of the first-past-the-post system. Votes cast in the district also count towards the calculation of proportional representation ("plurinominal") deputies elected from the first region.

The current member for the district, elected in the 2024 general election, is Tecutli José Guadalupe Gómez Villalobos of the Citizens' Movement (MC).

== District territory ==
Under the 2023 districting plan adopted by the National Electoral Institute (INE), which is to be used for the 2024, 2027 and 2030 federal elections, Jalisco's 2nd district covers the north-eastern part of Jalisco, between the states of Zacatecas, Aguascalientes and Guanajuato, and comprises 202 electoral precincts (secciones electorales) across seven of the state's 125 municipalities:

- Encarnación de Díaz, Lagos de Moreno, Ojuelos de Jalisco, San Juan de los Lagos, Teocaltiche, Unión de San Antonio and Villa Hidalgo.

The head town (cabecera distrital), where results from individual polling stations are gathered together and tallied, is the city of Lagos de Moreno. The district reported a population of 410,252 in the 2020 census.

== Previous districting schemes ==
Evolution of electoral district numbers
	1974	1978	1996	2005	2017	2023
Jalisco	13	20	19	19	20	20
Chamber of Deputies	196	300				

2017–2022

Jalisco regained its 20th congressional seat in the 2017 redistricting process. The 2nd district's head town was at Lagos de Moreno and it covered seven municipalities in the north-east of the state:
- Encarnación de Díaz, Lagos de Moreno, Ojuelos de Jalisco, San Diego de Alejandría, San Juan de los Lagos, San Julián and Unión de San Antonio.

2005–2017

Under the 2005 plan, Jalisco had 19 districts. This district's head town was at Lagos de Moreno and it covered the same seven municipalities as in the 2023 plan:
- Encarnación de Díaz, Lagos de Moreno, Ojuelos de Jalisco, San Juan de los Lagos, Teocaltiche, Unión de San Antonio and Villa Hidalgo.

1996–2005

In the 1996 scheme, under which Jalisco lost a single-member seat, the district had its head town at Lagos de Moreno and it comprised nine municipalities in the north-east of the state:
- Encarnación de Díaz, Lagos de Moreno, Ojuelos de Jalisco, San Diego de Alejandría, San Juan de los Lagos, San Julián, Teocaltiche, Unión de San Antonio and Villa Hidalgo.

1978–1996

The districting scheme in force from 1978 to 1996 was the result of the 1977 electoral reforms, which increased the number of single-member seats in the Chamber of Deputies from 196 to 300. Under that plan, Jalisco's seat allocation rose from 13 to 20. The 2nd district covered a part of the sector Libertad in the state capital, Guadalajara.

== Deputies returned to Congress ==
(Mexico) National parties
- Current
- PAN
- PRI
- PT
- PVEM
- MC
- Morena
- PAZ
- Somos
- Defunct or local only
- PLM
- PNR
- PRM
- PNM
- PP
- PPS
- PARM
- PFCRN
- CON
- PANAL
- PSD
- PES
- PES
- PRD

Jalisco's 2nd district
Election	Deputy	Party	Term	Legislature
1916	Marcelino Dávalos		1916–1917	Constituent Congress of Querétaro
...
1970	María Guadalupe Martínez de Hernández Loza	Institutional Revolutionary Party	1970–1973	48th Congress
1973	Gilberto Acosta Bernal	Institutional Revolutionary Party	1973–1976	49th Congress
1976	Reynaldo Dueñas Villaseñor	Institutional Revolutionary Party	1976–1979	50th Congress
1979	Agapito Isaac López	Institutional Revolutionary Party	1979–1982	51st Congress
1982	Ramiro Plascencia Loza	Institutional Revolutionary Party	1982–1985	52nd Congress
1985	Justino Delgado Caloca	Institutional Revolutionary Party	1985–1988	53rd Congress
1988	Sergio Alfonso Rueda Montoya	National Action Party (Mexico)	1988–1991	54th Congress
1991	Francisco Ruiz Guerrero	Institutional Revolutionary Party	1991–1994	55th Congress
1994	Miguel Acosta Ruelas	National Action Party (Mexico)	1994–1997	56th Congress
1997	María Antonia Durán López	National Action Party (Mexico)	1997–2000	57th Congress
2000	José de Jesús Hurtado Torres	National Action Party (Mexico)	2000–2003	58th Congress
2003	José Luis Treviño Rodríguez	National Action Party (Mexico)	2003–2006	59th Congress
2006	Martha Angélica Romo Jiménez	National Action Party (Mexico)	2006–2009	60th Congress
2009	Olivia Guillén Padilla	Institutional Revolutionary Party	2009–2012	61st Congress
2012	José Noel Pérez de Alba	Institutional Revolutionary Party	2012–2015	62nd Congress
2015	Evelyng Soraya Flores Carranza	Ecologist Green Party of Mexico	2015–2018	63rd Congress
2018	Martha Estela Romo Cuéllar	National Action Party (Mexico)	2018–2021	64th Congress
2021	Martha Estela Romo Cuéllar	National Action Party (Mexico)	2021–2024	65th Congress
2024	Tecutli José Guadalupe Gómez Villalobos	Citizens' Movement (Mexico)	2024–2027	66th Congress

== Presidential elections ==
Jalisco's 2nd district
Election	District won by	Party or coalition	%
2018	Ricardo Anaya Cortés	Por México al Frente	46.5175
2024	Bertha Xóchitl Gálvez Ruiz	Fuerza y Corazón por México	37.3474
