= José Treviño =

José Treviño may refer to:

- José Luis Treviño (born 1955), Mexican politician
- José Treviño (footballer) (born 1960), Mexican former professional European football player
- Jose Trevino (baseball) (born 1992), American professional baseball catcher
- José Treviño Morales, Mexican money launderer

== See also ==
- Treviño (surname)
