= Río Verde (Jalisco) =

Location
- Country: Mexico
- States: Jalisco, Aguascalientes, Zacatecas, Guanajuato, and San Luis Potosí

Physical characteristics
- Mouth
  - location: Río Grande de Santiago

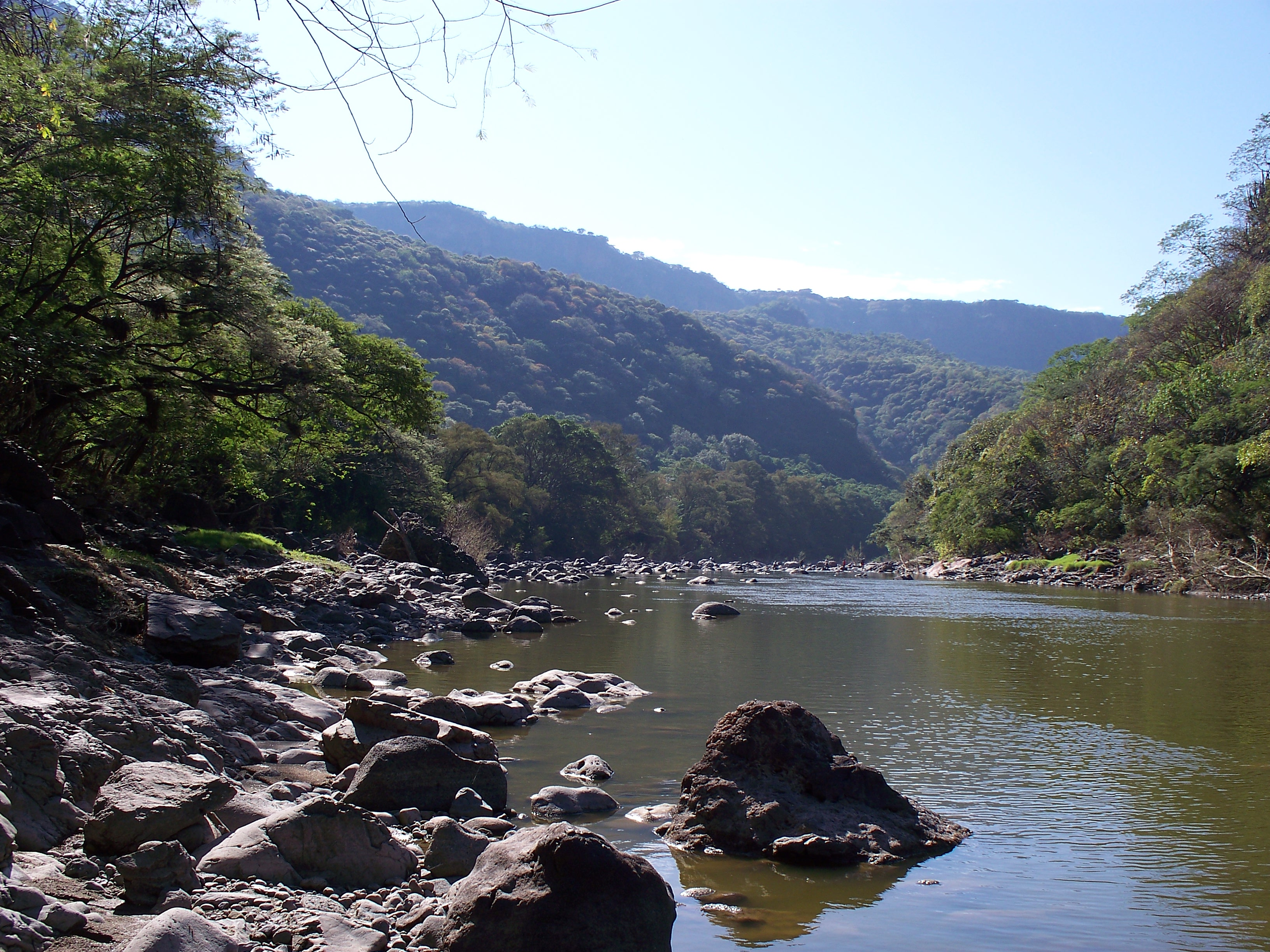

Río Verde (Spanish for "green river") is a river in central Mexico. It is a tributary of the Río Grande de Santiago. Its basin is mostly in the state of Jalisco, and extends into portions of Aguascalientes, Zacatecas, Guanajuato, and San Luis Potosí.

== Proposed dams ==
A National Water Commission project has proposed construction of two dams on the Río Verde: El Purgatorio and El Zapotillo.

=== El Purgatorio ===
El Purgatorio reservoir is proposed on the lower river, near its confluence with the Rio Grande de Santiago. It is intended to supply drinking water to the Guadalajara Metropolitan Area. Construction of the dam began in 2011. The Jalisco communities of Temacapulín, Palmarejo, and Acasico, which would be permanently flooded by the reservoir, have opposed the project, delaying its completion with lawsuits. As of August 2021 the dam is not completed and work had not resumed.

=== El Zapotillo ===
The El Zapotillo dam site is further upstream on the Río Verde. It was originally intended to provide water for both Guadalajara and León, which lies immediately southeast of the Río Verde basin. Work on El Zapotillo dam was also suspended as of August 2021.

The locals, with help from environmental groups and the IHE Delft Institute for Water Education, convinced the federal government to protect the three communities by limiting the dam's height to 80 meters (originally planned for 105 meters) and supply drinking water only to Guadalajara (not sending any water out of Jalisco to León).

The smaller dam was completed in 2024, which saved the three local villages from being flooded while still providing water to Guadalajara using the new El Salto–La Red–Calderón aqueduct.

== See also ==
- List of rivers of Mexico
