= Martha Angélica Romo Jiménez =

Mexican politician

- Born: 27 August 1961 (age 64); San Juan de los Lagos, Jalisco, Mexico
- Occupation: Politician
- Political party: PAN

Martha Angélica Romo Jiménez (born 27 August 1961) is a Mexican politician who is a member of the National Action Party (PAN), a conservative political party. In the 2006 general election she was elected to the Chamber of Deputies to represent Jalisco's 2nd district during the 60th session of Congress (1 September 2006 to 1 September 2009).
