= El Salto–La Red–Calderón aqueduct =

Intrastate aqueduct in Jalisco, Mexico

The El Salto–La Red–Calderón aqueduct (Spanish: Acueducto El Salto–La Red–Calderón) is an intrastate aqueduct in the Mexican state of Jalisco that transports water from the Altos de Jalisco to the Guadalajara metropolitan region. It was inaugurated for service on February 24, 2024.

== History ==
The El Salto–La Red–Calderón aqueduct is the first stage in a system of aqueducts connected to the El Salto, Calderón, and El Zapotillo dams. Construction on the latter was delayed by disputes between the Mexican government and villagers in the area of the Río Verde basin in Jalisco, whose homes were threatened by a proposal to raise the wall of the dam to 105 m (344 ft 6 in). The case reached the Supreme Court of Justice of the Nation, which decided in favor of the latter in 2013. Further disputes were settled in 2021, when the President of Mexico Andrés Manuel López Obrador canceled plans to build an aqueduct that would have transported water from El Zapotillo Dam to the city of León in the neighboring state of Guanajuato. He also stated that the water collected in the dam would only be transported within Jalisco and not used for industrial purposes. Severe drought conditions in Jalisco since 2020 intensified pressure for progress on the dam and aqueduct project.

On February 24, 2024, service at the El Salto–La Red–Calderón aqueduct was inaugurated. Among the dignitaries in attendance were López Obrador and Enrique Alfaro Ramírez, the governor of Jalisco. The aqueduct is 39 kilometres (24 mi) long and measures 54 inches (140 cm) in diameter. Water will be transported from the Altos de Jalisco to the Guadalajara metropolitan region at a rate of 1,000 litres (260 US gal) per second.

Once the El Zapotillo Dam begins service, the region will receive 3 kilolitres (3.9 cu yd) per second. According to Alfaro, had the aqueduct not started functioning on schedule, the area would have run out of water by late March or early April 2024.
