= Jesús Hurtado Torres =

Mexican politician (born 1965)

- Born: 13 July 1965 (age 60); Jalisco, Mexico
- Occupation: Politician
- Political party: PAN

José de Jesús Hurtado Torres (born 13 July 1965) is a Mexican politician from the National Action Party (PAN). In the 2000 general election he was elected to the Chamber of Deputies to represent Jalisco's 2nd district during the 58th session of Congress.
