= José Noel Pérez de Alba =

Mexican politician (born 1961)

- Born: 21 September 1961 (age 64); Jalisco, Mexico
- Education: ITESM
- Occupation: Politician
- Political party: PRI

José Noel Pérez de Alba (born 21 September 1961) is a Mexican politician affiliated with the Institutional Revolutionary Party (PRI). He served as a local deputy in the 59th session of the Congress of Jalisco (2010–2012) and, in the 2012 general election, he was elected to the Chamber of Deputies to represent Jalisco's 2nd district during the 62nd session of Congress.
