= Olivia Guillén Padilla =

Mexican politician (born 1959)

Olivia Guillén Padilla Ramirez
- Born: 8 November 1959 (age 66); Jalisco, Mexico
- Occupation: Politician
- Political party: PRI

Olivia Guillén Padilla (born 8 November 1959) is a Mexican politician from the Institutional Revolutionary Party (PRI). In the 2009 mid-terms she was elected to the Chamber of Deputies to represent Jalisco's 2nd district during the 61st session of Congress.
