= José Luis Treviño =

Mexican politician (born 1955)

- Born: 30 November 1955 (age 70); Jalisco, Mexico
- Occupation: Politician
- Political party: PAN

José Luis Treviño Rodríguez (born 30 November 1955) is a Mexican politician affiliated with the National Action Party (PAN). In the 2003 mid-terms he was elected to the Chamber of Deputies to represent Jalisco's 2nd district during the 59th session of Congress.
