= San Diego de Alejandría =

- Municipality and town
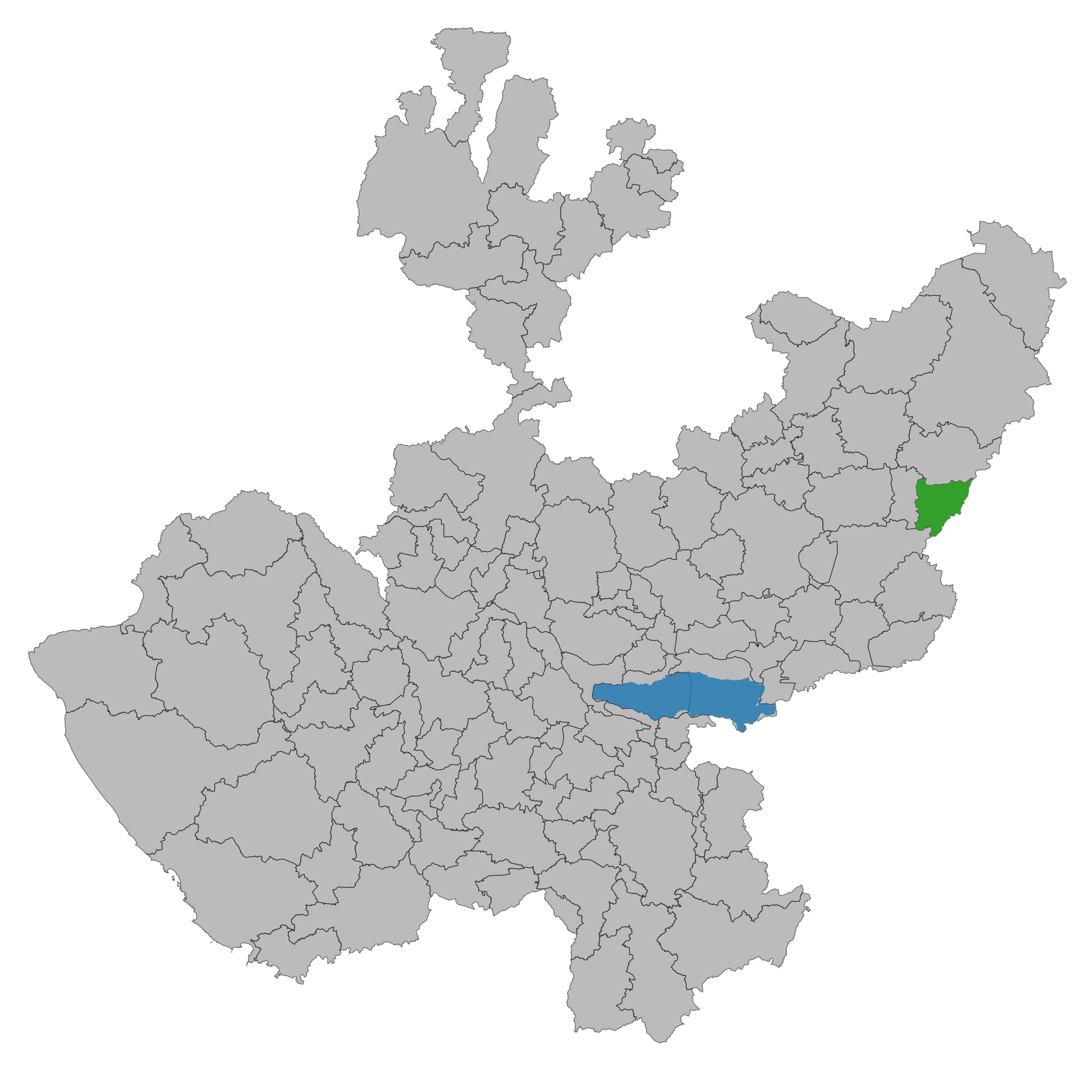
- Location of the municipality in Jalisco

- Location in Mexico
- Coordinates: 20°52′N 101°54′W
- Country: Mexico
- State: Jalisco

Area
  - Total: 351.7 km^{2} (135.8 sq mi)
  - Town: 2.64 km^{2} (1.02 sq mi)

Population (2020 census)
  - Total: 7,609
  - Density: 21.63/km^{2} (56.03/sq mi)
  - Town: 6,025
  - Town density: 2,280/km^{2} (5,910/sq mi)
- Time zone: UTC-6 (Central Standard Time)

San Diego de Alejandría is a town and municipality, in Jalisco in central-western Mexico. The municipality covers an area of 351.7 km^{2}.

As of 2005, the municipality had a total population of 6181.
