= Ojuelos de Jalisco =

- Municipality and Town
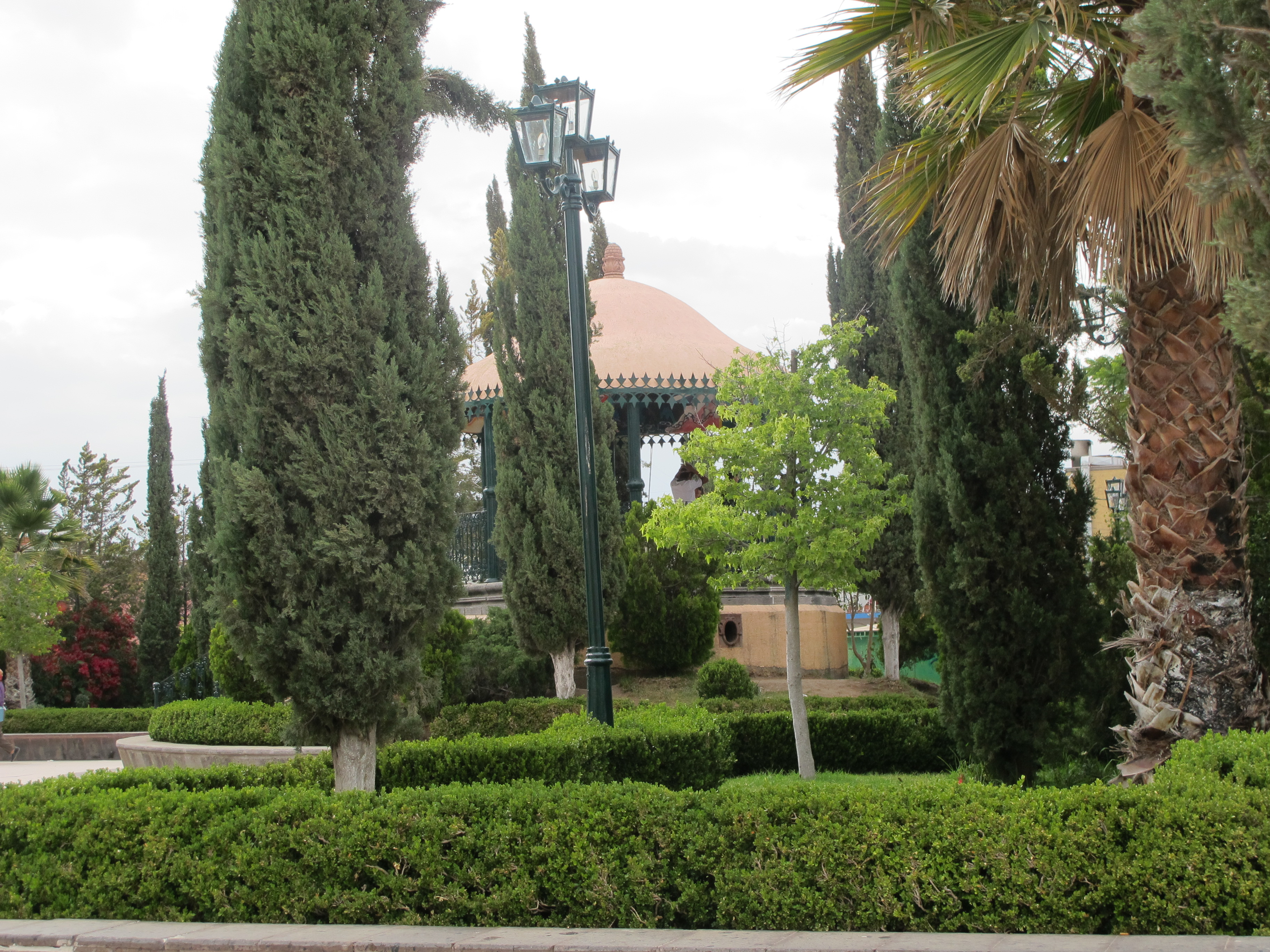
- Plaza de Armas

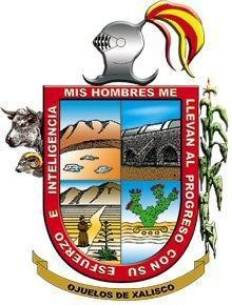
- Coat of arms

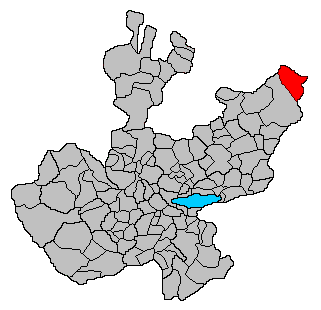
- Location of the municipality in Jalisco

- Location in Mexico
- Coordinates: 21°52′N 101°35′W
- Country: Mexico
- State: Jalisco
- Garrison built: 1569

Government
  - Mayor / Presidente Municipal: Marco Antonio Jasso Romo

Area
  - Total: 1,156.71 km^{2} (446.61 sq mi)

Population (2010)
  - Total: 30,097
- Time zone: UTC-6 (Central Standard Time)
- Postcode: 47540
- Area code: 496

Ojuelos de Jalisco is a town and municipality in the state of Jalisco, Mexico, being the easternmost municipality in Jalisco. The town's 1990 population was 7,265, although by the year 2010 it had increased to 11,881.

It sits at the junction of Mexico Highways 51, 70, and 80. The municipality is located in the North-Central region of Mexico. It is bordered by 3 states: Guanajuato, Zacatecas and Aguascalientes. Also, it is located in close proximity to the state of San Luis Potosi. All of the above makes of Ojuelos one of the municipalities with the most borders in Mexico. It also borders with the Lagos de Moreno municipality in the state of Jalisco.

== History ==
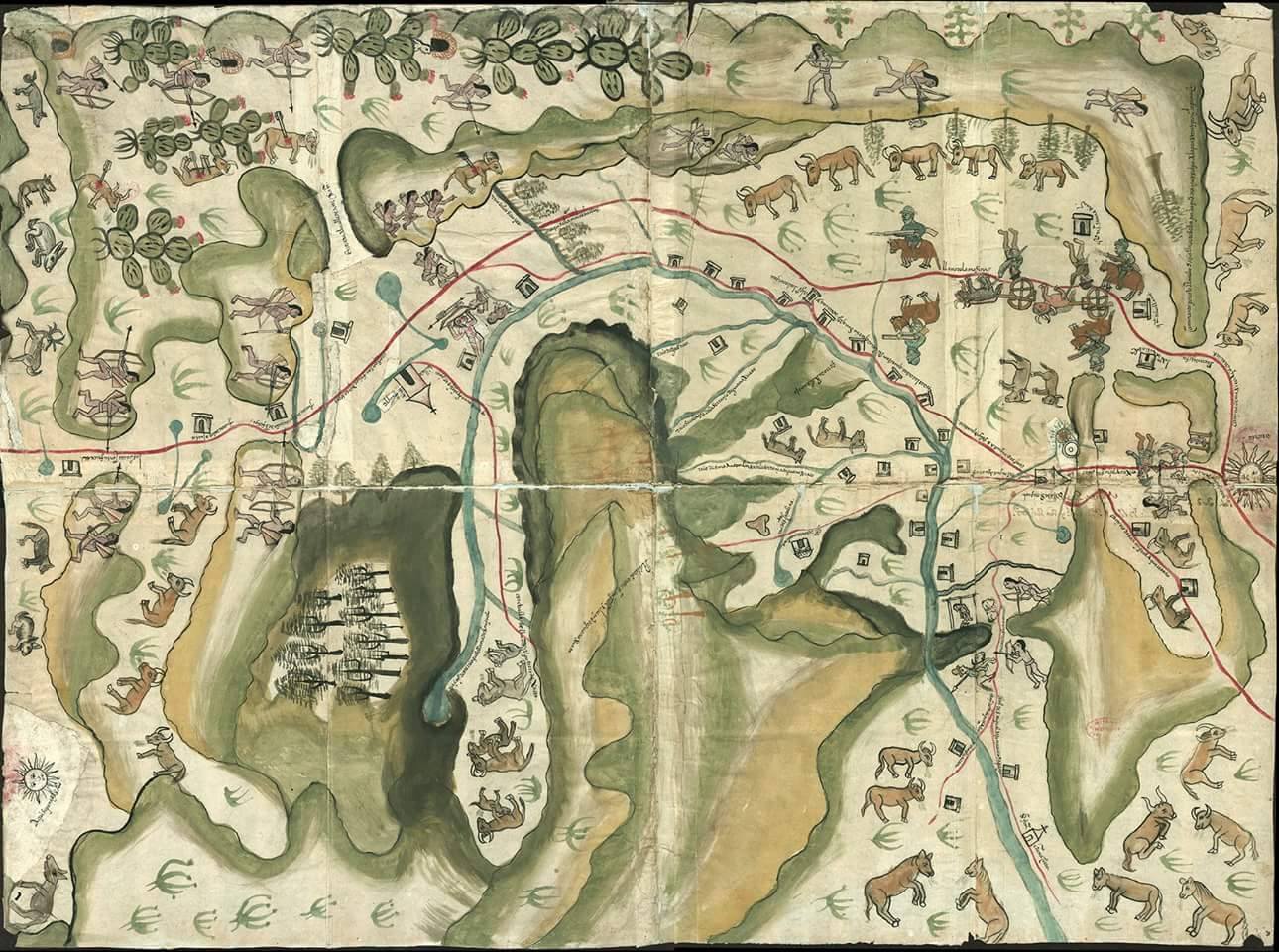
Oldest map of the North Central region of Mexico. 16th century. The original map is preserved in the National History Museum in Madrid, Spain

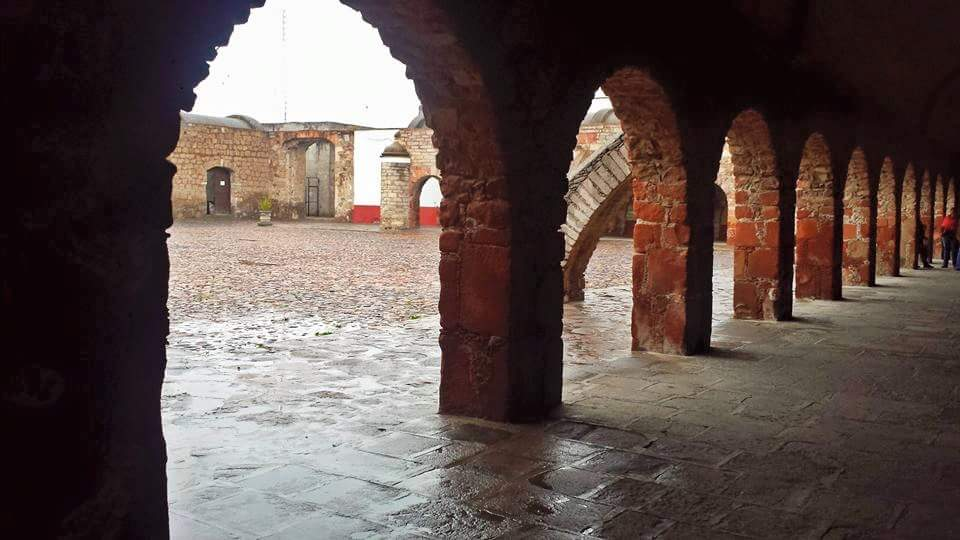
Overview of the Fort Ojuelos

The city was founded by Spanish conquistador Pedro Carrillo Davila in 1569, as a fortification or military garrison to protect travelers against the Chichimecas warriors. The fortification of Ojuelos was one of the seven ones built at the request of the Viceroy Martín Enriquez de Almanza in the important route Mexico-Zacatecas which later became the Camino Real de Tierra Adentro. The fortification in Ojuelos was the first being built and it is only one still in place. The decision to build the seven fortifications was made by Viceroy Enriquez de Almanza in response to deadly attacks made by Chichimecas commanded by their legendary leader Maxorro.

Ojuelos has a significant value in Colonial history in Mexico and North America, since its fortification is the only one which has survived to present day keeping its main structure as originally built in 1569. Currently, it houses the offices of the City Hall and a Library.

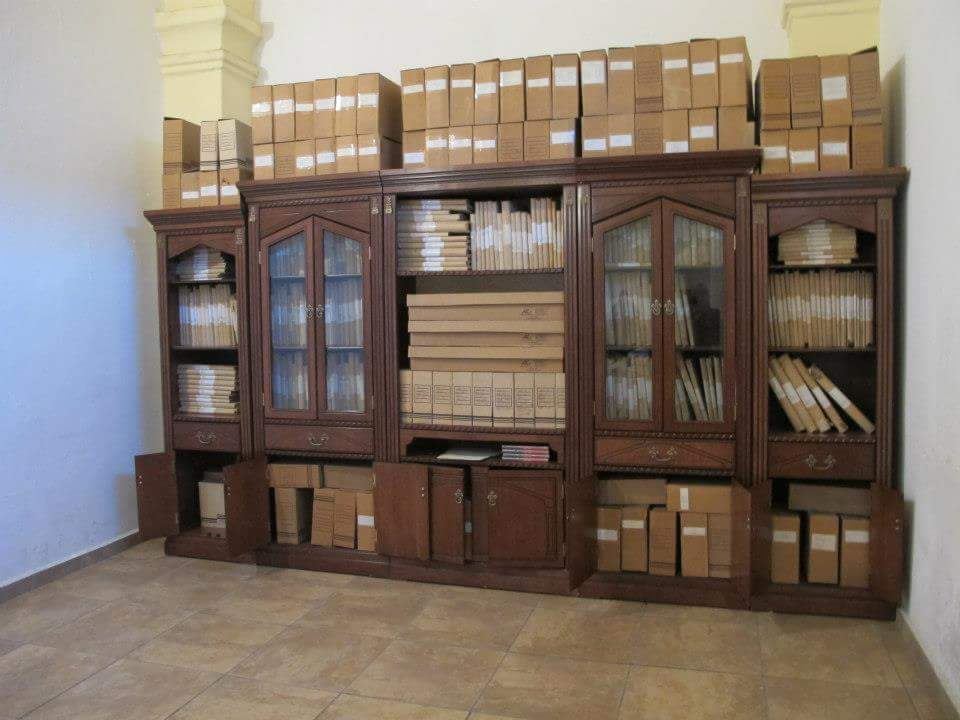
The Archive of the Ojuelos's Hacienda.

In 1874, Ojuelos was designated as Municipality by Ignacio L. Vallarta, Governor of the State of Jalisco, after a long border dispute with the state of Zacatecas.

In 2010, Ojuelos was declared a World Heritage Site by UNESCO as part of the Camino Real de Tierra Adentro 2010. Camino Real de Tierra Adentro was the Royal Inland Road, also known as the Silver Route. This UNESCO's World Heritage Site consists of a series of sites lying along a 1400 km section of this 2600 km route, that extends north from Mexico City to Texas and New Mexico, United States of America. The route was actively used as a trade route for 300 years, from the mid-16th to the 19th centuries, mainly for transporting silver extracted from the mines of Zacatecas, Guanajuato and San Luis Potosí, and mercury imported from Europe. Although it is a route that was motivated and consolidated by the mining industry, it also fostered the creation of social, cultural and religious links in particular between Spanish and Amerindian cultures. In the case of Ojuelos, the specific sites inscribed in the UNESCO Roster are the historic downtown of Ojuelos (Site 1351-018) including "El Fuerte", "El Parian" and other historic buildings, and the Bridge of Ojuelos "El Puente de Ojuelos" (Site 1351-019).

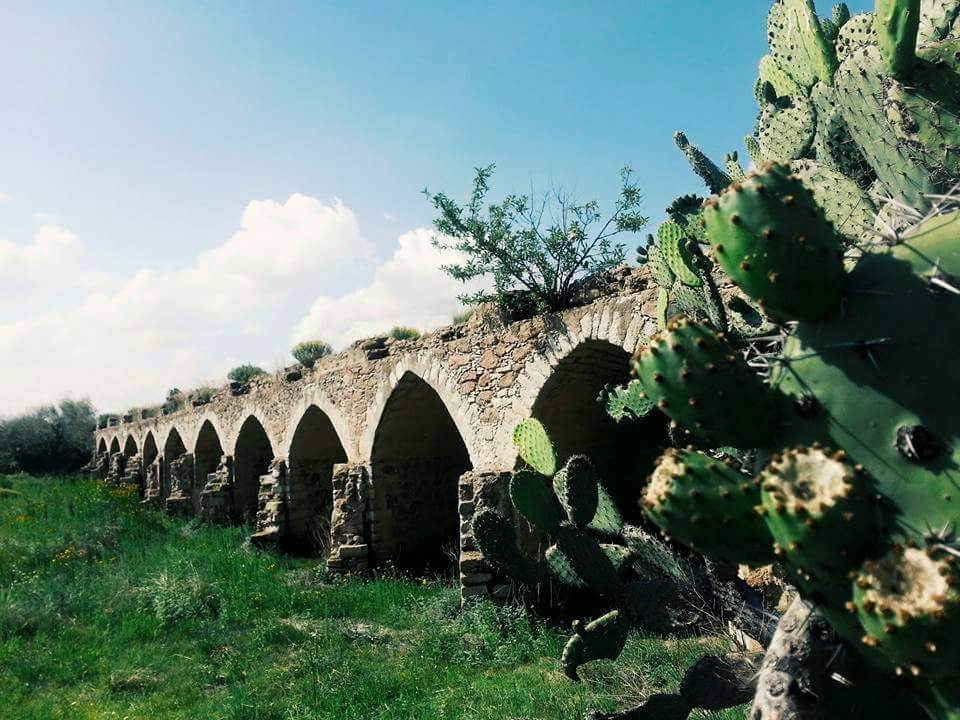
Bridge built in 1569 as part of the "Camino de Tierra Adentro" route

== Culture ==
In Ojuelos are manufacture of wool serapes, pottery, and colonial furniture, also elaboration of eggnog (rompope) and prickly pear fruit sweet paste.

== Landmarks ==
=== Architecture ===
- Among other touristic attractions, Ojuelos also has a plaza, El Parián, which is surrounded by 102 Gothic arches. El Parián was designed at the end of the 19th century by priest Luis G. Maciel.

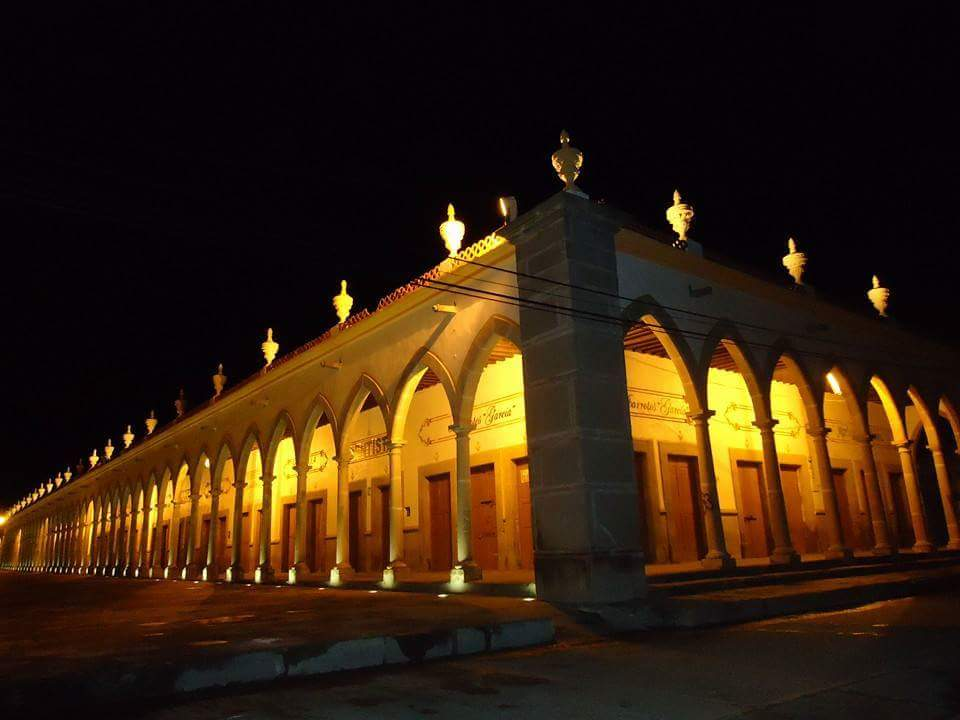
The Parian Plaza in Ojuelos, Mexico. 102 Gothic arches. Built in the 19th century

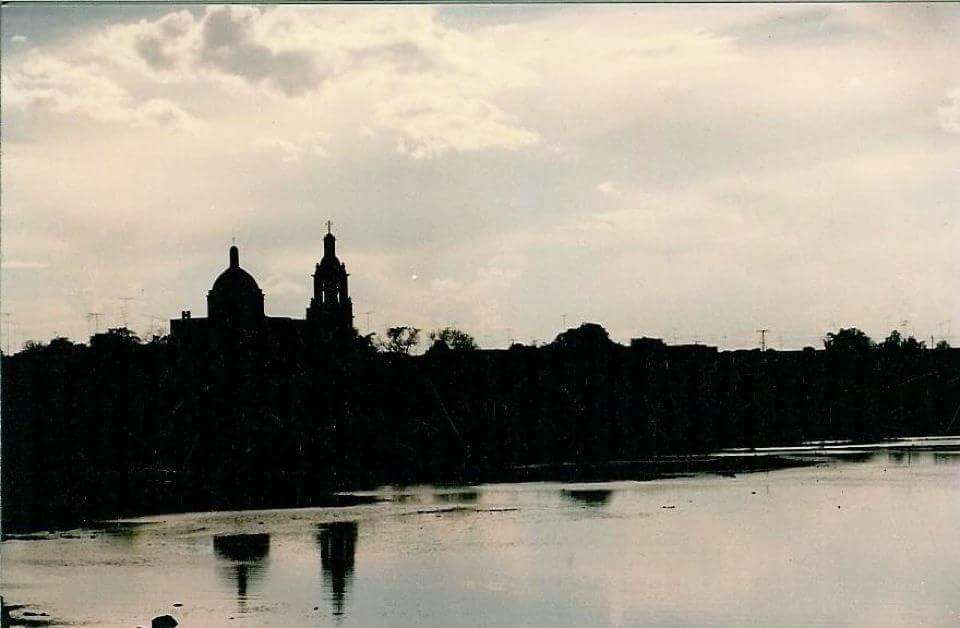
View of the Ojuelos Parish from the pond

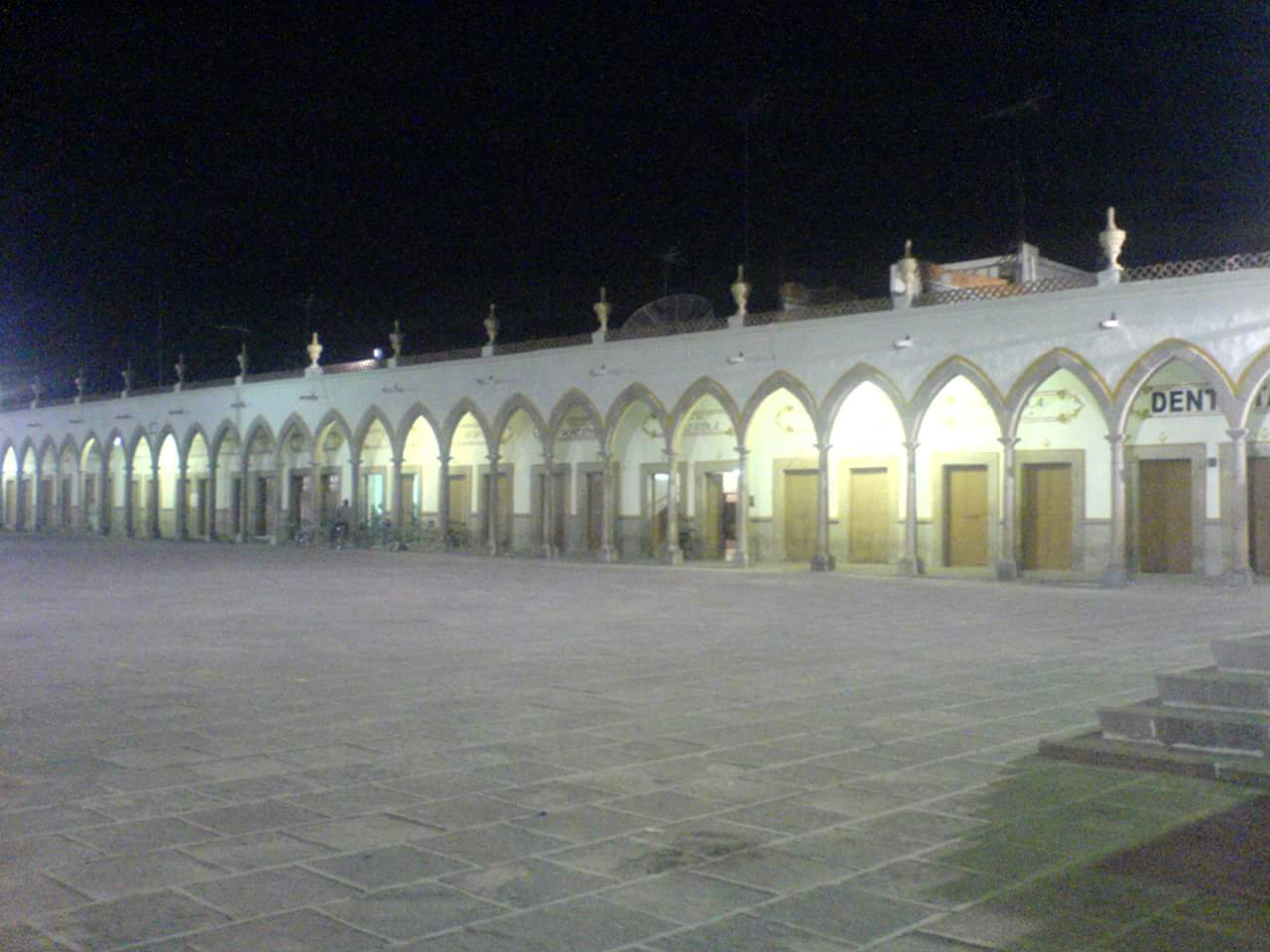
Parián Plaza. Built at the end of the 19th century

- El Fuerte (Municipal Palace). Built in the 16th century.
- Hacienda de Ojuelos (typical hacienda house, which today is used as a training and meeting center for the parochial church).
- The Bridge of Ojuelos. Built in the 16th century

=== Churches ===
- Temple of San José.

=== Parks and reserves ===
- Cerro del Toro and the Mayal (Hill of the Bull and the Mayal).
- Cerro de Buenavista (Hill of Good View).

== Most central Mexican place controversy ==
In the Plaza de Armas (Main Square) of Ojuelos (between the Municipal Presidency and the Parish Church of San José) there is a multicolored three-dimensional sign which reads, "OJUELOS" and below this word, in smaller white letters, the phrase "Corazón de México" (Heart of Mexico), and when searching in Google Maps the following: "Centro de México, Ojuelos", the website (or the Google Maps application) displays a satellite map with the legend: "Centro de México" and the image of a white silhouette-symbol of a photographic camera. By clicking or tapping on said camera, photographs of the main square of the town are opened, where there is a statue of a Christ with a crown of thorns, placed on a pedestal in the shape of a truncated quadrangular pyramid, and the aforementioned sign. Presumably this square 21°52′0.93″N 101°35′26.16″W is the geographic centre of the United Mexican States.

Hoaxes of this kind have been around for decades. The townsfolk of Tequisquiapan, Querétaro, boast of having the "geographic centre" of the country, 20°31′17.62″N 99°53′38.2″W by agreement of 1916 of the first head of the Constitutionalist Army and in charge of the Federal Executive Power Venustiano Carranza. In May 1970, the municipal authorities of Tequisquiapan unveiled an allusive plaque.

The city of Aguascalientes once also claimed to be the centre, and the authorities of that municipality placed a plaque in the Main Square of that city (it is no longer there).

For its part, the National Institute of Statistics and Geography (INEGI, Instituto Nacional de Estadística y Geografía) indicates that the geographic centre of Mexico, when taking into account only the continental extremes, is located at the following coordinates: 23°37′43″N 101°55′48″W, a point to the north-northwest of Nueva Pastoría, a town located in the Zacatecan municipality Villa de Cos.

But INEGI's calculation is based on averages of the means of the several longest straight lines that can be drawn between the extremes of the country.

== Government ==
=== Municipal presidents ===
Term	Municipal president	Political party	Notes
1874	Domingo Macías Valadez		
1875-1876	Pablo López		
1877	Domingo Delgado		
1878	Amado Ornelas		
1879	Domingo Macías Valadez		
1880-1882	Leonardo Quevedo		
1883	Domingo Macías Valadez		
1884	Felipe Alba		
1885-1890	Domingo Macías Valadez		
1891-1893	Santiago S. Cárdenas		
1894-1895	Daniel V. Medina		
1896-1897	J. Jesús Ruvalcaba		
1898	Juan Aranda		
1899	Domingo Macías López		
1900	Joaquín Macías		
1901-1902	Domingo Macías López		
1903-1904	Salvador González		
1908	Domingo Macías López		
1909-1911	J. Jesús Ruvalcaba		
1912	J. Refugio Delgadillo		
1913	J. Jesús Ruvalcaba		
1914-1916	Domingo Macías López		
1917-1920	Ramón Díaz de León Medina		
1921	Nicolás Mascorro López		
1924-1926	J. Guadalupe Delgadillo		
1927-1929	José Romo Martínez		
1931-1934	Sebastián Arce Moreno	PNR	
1935	Alfonso Macías	PNR	
1936	Cipriano Romo Álvarez	PNR	
1937	Francisco Hernández	PNR	
1938-1939	J. Isabel Rodríguez Montoya	PRM	
1940	Manuel Torres	PRM	
1940	Juan Plascencia R.	PRM	
1941-1942	J. Isabel Rodríguez Montoya	PRM	
1943	Fortino Morales Olvera	PRM	
1944	Francisco González Delgado	PRM	
1945	J. Guadalupe Urzúa López	PRM	
1946	Joaquín Quevedo Martín del Campo	PRI	
1947-1948	Francisco González Delgado	PRI	
1949	Francisco Delgado Alférez	PRI	
1950	J. Jesús Quevedo Aranda	PRI	
1951-1952	José González Ortiz	PRI	
1953-1955	Francisco González Delgado	PRI	
1956-1958	J. Jesús Medina Moreno	PRI	
1959-1961	Antonio Macías Álvarez	PRI	
1962-1964	Francisco González Delgado	PRI	
1965-1967	Jesús Ibarra López	PRI	
1968-1970	Juan Plascencia Robledo	PRI	
1971-1973	J. Jesús Díaz de León González	PRI	
1974-1976	J. Refugio Calzada Plascencia	PRI	
1977-1979	Joaquín Ibarra Alcalá	PRI	
1980-1982	Francisco González Hernández	PRI	
1986-1988	Ángel Pérez Lozano	PRI	
1989-1992	Tomás Gómez Sánchez	PRI	
1992-1995	Rafael Marmolejo Amaya	PRI	
1995-1997	Salvador Vela Briones	PRI	
1998-2000	Marco Antonio Jasso Romo	PRD	
2001-2003	Benjamín Plascencia Gómez	PRD	
2004-2006	Juan César Contreras Macías	PRI	
01/01/2007-31/12/2009	Rafael Dávila González	PRD; PT	
01/01/2010-30/09/2012	José Gil Macías	PAN	
01/10/2012-30/09/2015	José de Jesús Tovar Gómez	PRI; PVEM	Coalition "Compromise for Jalisco"
01/10/2015-31/03/2018	David González González	PRI; PVEM	He applied for a temporary leave, to run for reelection, which he didn't get
31/03/2018-31/08/2018	Juan Carlos Jasso Romo	PAN; PRD	Acting municipal president
01/09/2018-30/09/2018	David González González	PRI; PVEM	Resumed
01/10/2018-04/03/2021	Marco Antonio Jasso Romo	PAN; PRD; MC	He applied for a temporary leave, to run for reelection, which he got
05/03/2021-07/06/2021	Julio César Escalante Marmolejo	PAN; PRD; MC	Acting municipal president
08/06/2021-30/09/2021	Marco Antonio Jasso Romo	PAN; PRD; MC	Resumed
01/10/2021-30/09/2024	Marco Antonio Jasso Romo	MC	He was reelected on 06/06/2021

== Climate ==
Climate data for Ojuelos de Jalisco (1991–2020 normals, extremes 1986–present)
Month	Jan	Feb	Mar	Apr	May	Jun	Jul	Aug	Sep	Oct	Nov	Dec	Year
Record high °C (°F)	30 (86)	33.5 (92.3)	31 (88)	44 (111)	41 (106)	39 (102)	35 (95)	34 (93)	33 (91)	32 (90)	33 (91)	30 (86)	44 (111)
Mean daily maximum °C (°F)	18.3 (64.9)	20.6 (69.1)	23.1 (73.6)	26.0 (78.8)	26.7 (80.1)	25.5 (77.9)	23.9 (75.0)	23.7 (74.7)	22.3 (72.1)	22.1 (71.8)	20.4 (68.7)	18.9 (66.0)	22.6 (72.7)
Daily mean °C (°F)	10.1 (50.2)	12.0 (53.6)	14.1 (57.4)	16.8 (62.2)	18.1 (64.6)	18.2 (64.8)	17.1 (62.8)	16.9 (62.4)	16.0 (60.8)	14.7 (58.5)	12.3 (54.1)	10.7 (51.3)	14.8 (58.6)
Mean daily minimum °C (°F)	1.9 (35.4)	3.4 (38.1)	5.0 (41.0)	7.6 (45.7)	9.5 (49.1)	10.8 (51.4)	10.3 (50.5)	10.1 (50.2)	9.7 (49.5)	7.3 (45.1)	4.1 (39.4)	2.5 (36.5)	6.8 (44.2)
Record low °C (°F)	−8 (18)	−5 (23)	−5 (23)	0.5 (32.9)	2.5 (36.5)	2 (36)	5 (41)	6 (43)	2 (36)	−2 (28)	−5 (23)	−12 (10)	−12 (10)
Average precipitation mm (inches)	24.3 (0.96)	18.9 (0.74)	12.3 (0.48)	8.9 (0.35)	39.1 (1.54)	95.1 (3.74)	113.6 (4.47)	111.5 (4.39)	135.1 (5.32)	41.2 (1.62)	11.4 (0.45)	11.8 (0.46)	623.2 (24.54)
Average precipitation days	2.5	1.9	1.6	1.7	5.2	9.0	10.4	8.3	8.6	4.4	1.8	1.5	56.9
Source: Servicio Meteorológico Nacional
