= Villa Hidalgo, Jalisco =

- Municipality and town
- Main plaza of Villa Hidalgo

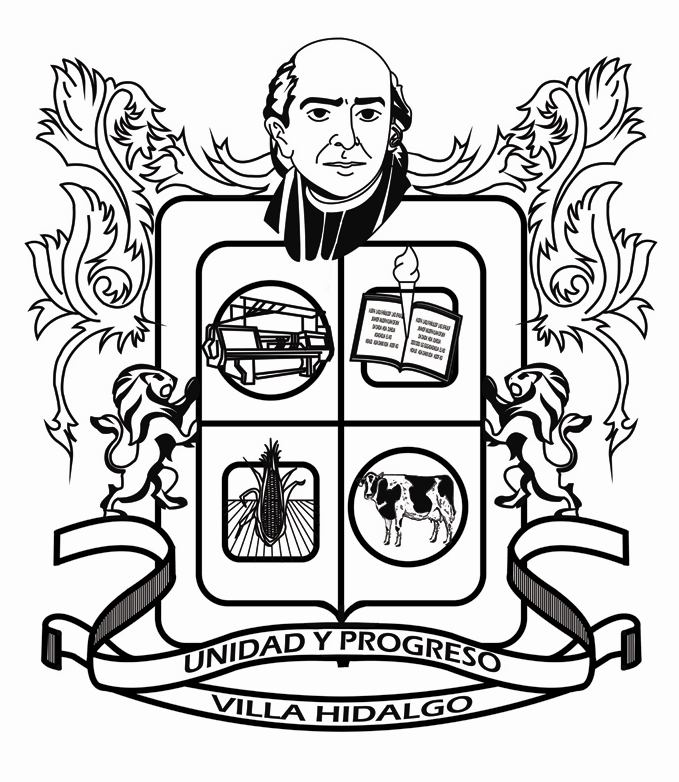
- Coat of arms
- Nickname: Villa
- Motto: "Heart of the Textile Industry in Mexico"
- Location in Mexico Villa Hidalgo, Jalisco (Mexico)
- Coordinates: 21°40′N 102°36′W
- Country: Mexico
- State: Jalisco

Area
  - Total: 452.9 km^{2} (174.9 sq mi)
  - Town: 4.45 km^{2} (1.72 sq mi)

Population (2020 census)
  - Total: 20,088
  - Density: 44.35/km^{2} (114.9/sq mi)
  - Town: 15,594
  - Town density: 3,500/km^{2} (9,080/sq mi)
- Time zone: UTC-6 (Central Standard Time)

Villa Hidalgo (formerly, Paso de Sotos) is a municipality in the state of Jalisco in Mexico.

Villa Hidalgo gets its name in honor of Mexican hero Miguel Hidalgo y Costilla.

There is an annual celebration in Villa Hidalgo on the last Sunday in January including the week leading to it. It is in celebration of the Virgin of Guadalupe.

It is located approximately between 21°33′ and 21°47′ north latitude, and 102°25′ and 102°45′ west longitude. The municipality's elevation ranges between 1,800 and 2,700 meters above sea level, depending on the specific location. Its terrain includes flat areas and gently sloping regions, with a smaller proportion of steep or rugged landforms.

The town is located approximately 45 minutes drive away from the state border with Aguascalientes.
