= Unión de San Antonio =

- Municipality and Town
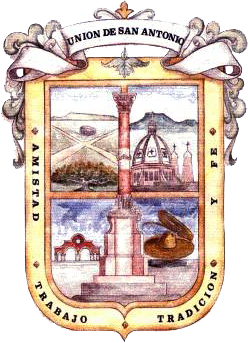
- Coat of arms

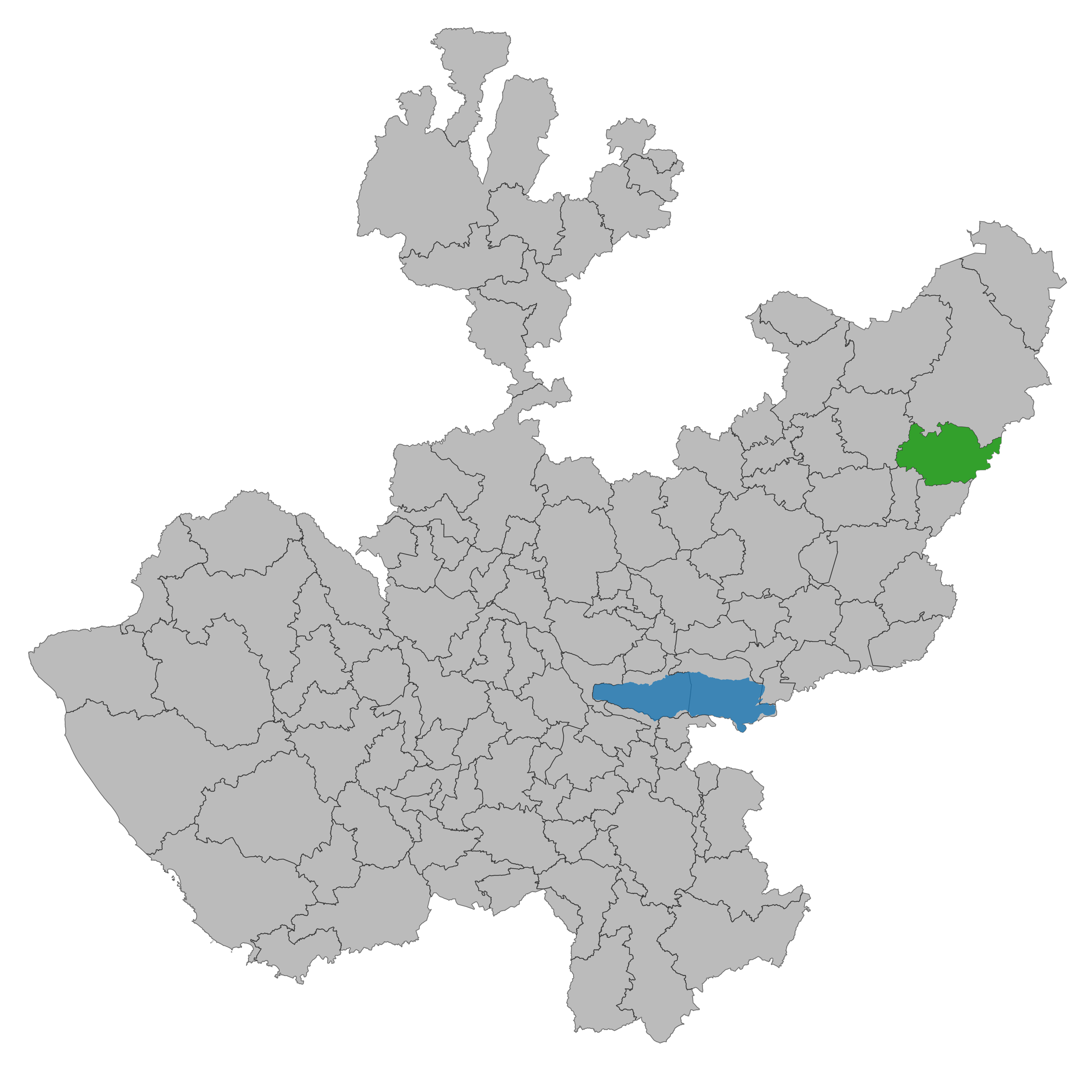
- Location of the municipality in Jalisco

- Location in Mexico
- Coordinates: 21°7′40.8″N 102°0′21.6″W
- Country: Mexico
- State: Jalisco

Area
  - Total: 728.8 km^{2} (281.4 sq mi)
  - Town: 3.55 km^{2} (1.37 sq mi)

Population (2020 census)
  - Total: 19,069
  - Density: 26.16/km^{2} (67.77/sq mi)
  - Town: 8,737
  - Town density: 2,460/km^{2} (6,370/sq mi)
- Time zone: UTC-6 (Central Standard Time)

Unión de San Antonio is a town and municipality located in the Mexican state of Jalisco. It is named after Saint Anthony of Padua since the first church built there was in his honor. As of 2005, the municipality had a population of 15,484. It is located about 32 km (20 mi) west of León, Guanajuato. The main local industry is agriculture, including maize, wheat, beans, and livestock.

The small town receives its name from the intersection of two roads at the "Old Dam", which currently still exists on the east side of town. Don Pablo and Don Jose Antonio constructed the chapel that became the center of the town.

== Notable people ==
- José Antonio Sánchez Reza A priest who sympathized with Miguel Hildago's cause and helped to support him.
- José Elías Moreno, an actor from the Classic era of the motion pictures was born here.
- María Teresa Rivas, an actress from the Classic era of the motion pictures was born here.

== History ==
At the beginning of the nineteenth century, it was known as Hacienda of Saint Anthony of the Adobes and later Villa of Union.
