= Región Altos Sur, Jalisco =

Altos Sur Region
- Region
- #3-Altos Sur Region
- Country: Mexico
- State: Jalisco
- Largest city: Tepatitlán de Morelos

Area
  - Total: 6,994 km^{2} (2,700 sq mi)

Population (2020)
  - Total: 411,448
- Time zone: UTC−6 (CST)

The Altos Sur region is one of the regions of the Mexican state of Jalisco.. It includes twelve municipalities with a population of 411,448 inhabitants as of 2020.

== Municipalities ==
Municipality code	Name	Population		Land Area			Population density	
Municipality code	Name	2020	Rank	km^{2}	sq mi	Rank	2020	Rank
001	Acatic	23,175	5	951	367	2	24/km^{2} (63/sq mi)	9
008	Arandas	80,609	2	708	273	4	114/km^{2} (295/sq mi)	1
117	Cañadas de Obregón	4,388	12	251	97	10	17/km^{2} (45/sq mi)	12
046	Jalostotitlán	32,678	3	567	219	7	58/km^{2} (149/sq mi)	5
048	Jesús María	18,982	7	665	257	5	29/km^{2} (74/sq mi)	8
060	Mexticacán	5,307	11	281	108	9	19/km^{2} (49/sq mi)	10
125	San Ignacio Cerro Gordo	18,341	8	228	88	12	80/km^{2} (208/sq mi)	3
074	San Julián	16,792	9	248	96	11	68/km^{2} (175/sq mi)	4
078	San Miguel el Alto	31,965	4	741	286	3	43/km^{2} (112/sq mi)	6
093	Tepatitlán de Morelos	150,190	1	1,388	536	1	108/km^{2} (280/sq mi)	2
111	Valle de Guadalupe	6,627	10	368	142	8	18/km^{2} (47/sq mi)	11
118	Yahualica de González Gallo	22,394	6	598	231	6	37/km^{2} (97/sq mi)	7
	Altos Sur Region	411,448	—	6,994	2,700.40	—	59/km^{2} (152/sq mi)	—
Source: INEGI

=== Largest cities ===
Largest cities or towns in Altos Sur Region Source:
Rank		Municipality	Pop.
1	Tepatitlán de Morelos	Tepatitlán de Morelos	98,842
2	Arandas	Arandas	59,648
3	San Miguel el Alto	San Miguel el Alto	25,925
4	Jalostotitlán	Jalostotitlán	24,980
5	Capilla de Guadalupe	Tepatitlán de Morelos	15,640
6	San Julián	San Julián	14,520
7	Yahualica de González Gallo	Yahualica de González Gallo	14,497
8	Acatic	Acatic	13,033
9	San Ignacio Cerro Gordo	San Ignacio Cerro Gordo	10,521
10	Jesús María	Jesús María	9,436
