= 3rd federal electoral district of Jalisco =

Federal electoral district of Mexico

Jalisco's 3rd
- Electoral district of the Chamber of Deputies of Mexico

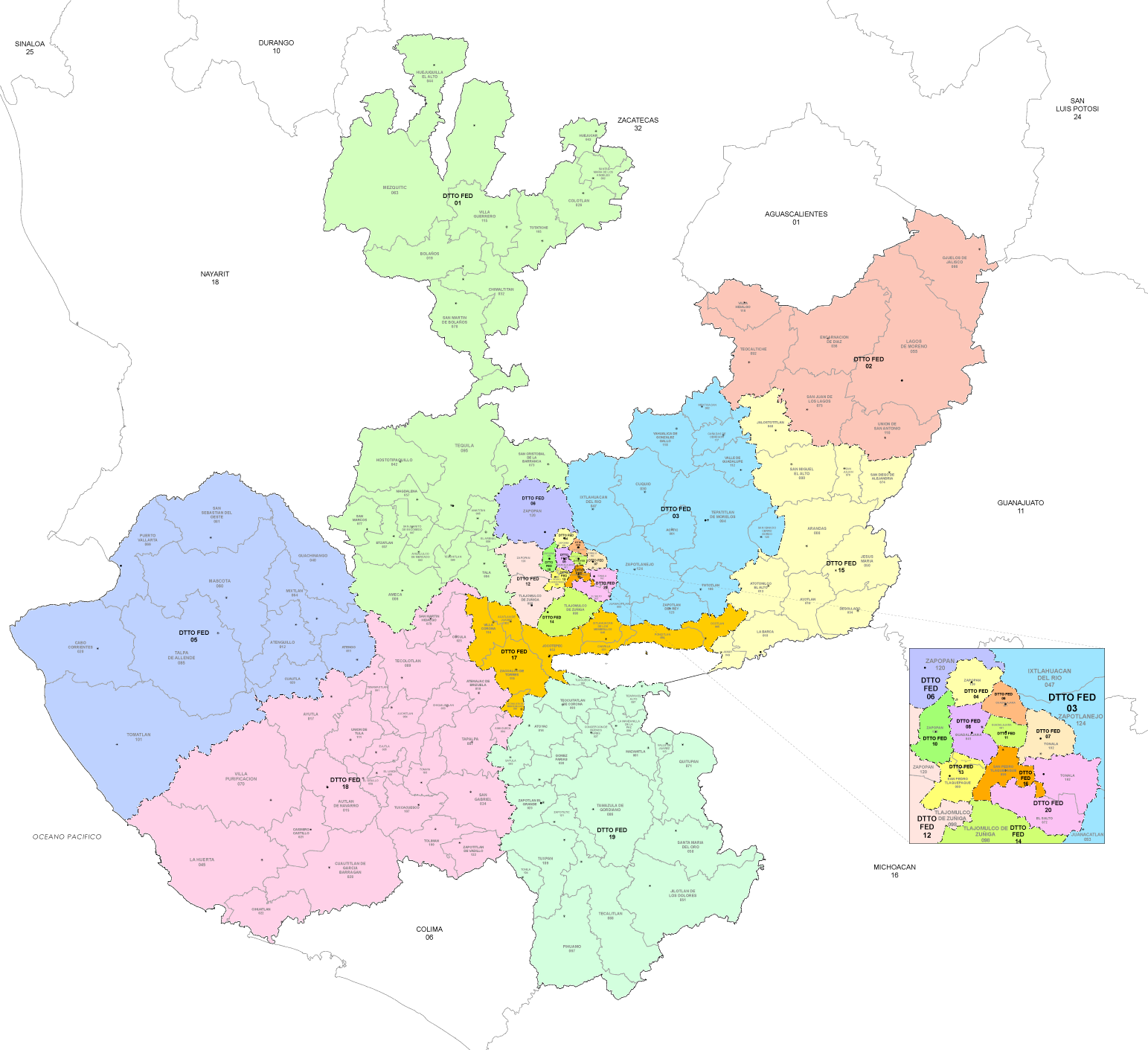
- 3rd district

Incumbent
- Member: José Mario Íñiguez
- Party: ▌National Action Party
- Congress: 66th (2024–2027)

District
- State: Jalisco
- Head town: Tepatitlán
- Coordinates: 20°49′N 102°46′W
- Covers: 13 municipalities: Acatic, Cañadas de Obregón, Cuquío, Ixtlahuacán del Río, Juanacatlán, Mexticacán, San Ignacio Cerro Gordo, Tepatitlán de Morelos, Tototlán, Valle de Guadalupe, Yahualica de González Gallo, Zapotlán del Rey, Zapotlanejo
- PR region: First
- Precincts: 208
- Population: 407,269 (2020 census)

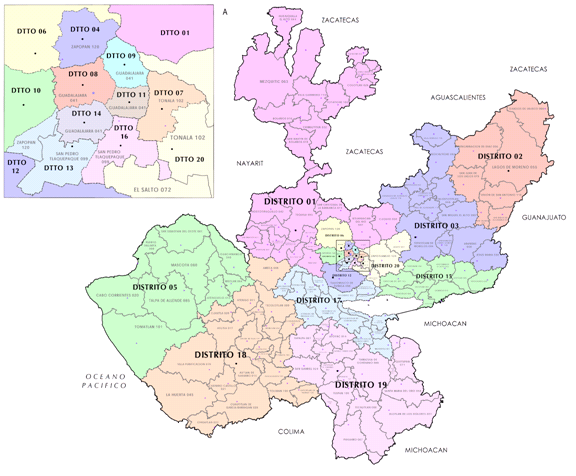
Jalisco's districts in 2017–2022

The 3rd federal electoral district of Jalisco (Spanish: Distrito electoral federal 03 de Jalisco) is one of the 300 electoral districts into which Mexico is divided for elections to the federal Chamber of Deputies and one of 20 such districts in the state of Jalisco.

It elects one deputy to the lower house of Congress for each three-year legislative session by means of the first-past-the-post system. Votes cast in the district also count towards the calculation of proportional representation ("plurinominal") deputies elected from the first region.

The current member for the district, elected in the 2024 general election, is José Mario Íñiguez Franco of the National Action Party (PAN).

== District territory ==
Under the 2023 districting plan adopted by the National Electoral Institute (INE), which is to be used for the 2024, 2027 and 2030 federal elections, Jalisco's 3rd district is located in the east of the state and comprises 208 electoral precincts (secciones electorales) across 13 of the state's 125 municipalities:

- Acatic, Cañadas de Obregón, Cuquío, Ixtlahuacán del Río, Juanacatlán, Mexticacán, San Ignacio Cerro Gordo, Tepatitlán de Morelos, Tototlán, Valle de Guadalupe, Yahualica de González Gallo, Zapotlán del Rey and Zapotlanejo.

The head town (cabecera distrital), where results from individual polling stations are gathered together and tallied, is the city of Tepatitlán. The district reported a population of 407,269 in the 2020 census.

== Previous districting schemes ==
Evolution of electoral district numbers
	1974	1978	1996	2005	2017	2023
Jalisco	13	20	19	19	20	20
Chamber of Deputies	196	300				

2017–2022

Jalisco regained its 20th congressional seat in the 2017 redistricting process. The 3rd district's head town was at Tepatitlán and it covered 12 municipalities in the north-east of the state:
- Arandas, Cañadas de Obregón, Jalostotitlán, Jesús María, Mexticacán, San Ignacio Cerro Gordo, San Miguel el Alto, Teocaltiche, Tepatitlán de Morelos, Valle de Guadalupe, Villa Hidalgo and Yahualica de González Gallo.

2005–2017

Under the 2005 plan, Jalisco had 19 districts. This district's head town was at Tepatitlán and it covered 11 municipalities in the north-east of the state:
- Acatic, Arandas, Cañadas de Obregón, Jalostotitlán, Mexticacán, San Diego de Alejandría, San Julián, San Miguel el Alto, Tepatitlán de Morelos, Valle de Guadalupe and Yahualica de González Gallo.

1996–2005

In the 1996 scheme, under which Jalisco lost a single-member seat, the district had its head town at Tepatitlán and it comprised 10 municipalities in the north-east of the state:
- Acatic, Arandas, Cañadas de Obregón, Jalostotitlán, Jesús María, Mexticacán, San Miguel el Alto, Tepatitlán de Morelos, Valle de Guadalupe and Yahualica de González Gallo.

1978–1996

The districting scheme in force from 1978 to 1996 was the result of the 1977 electoral reforms, which increased the number of single-member seats in the Chamber of Deputies from 196 to 300. Under that plan, Jalisco's seat allocation rose from 13 to 20. The 3rd district covered a part of the sector Juárez in the state capital, Guadalajara.

== Deputies returned to Congress ==
(Mexico) National parties
- Current
- PAN
- PRI
- PT
- PVEM
- MC
- Morena
- PAZ
- Somos
- Defunct or local only
- PLM
- PNR
- PRM
- PNM
- PP
- PPS
- PARM
- PFCRN
- CON
- PANAL
- PSD
- PES
- PES
- PRD

Jalisco's 3rd district
Election	Deputy	Party	Term	Legislature
1916	Federico E. Ibarra		1916–1917	Constituent Congress of Querétaro
...
1970	Genaro Cornejo Cornejo	Institutional Revolutionary Party	1970–1973	48th Congress
1973	Guillermo Arturo Gómez Reyes	Institutional Revolutionary Party	1973–1976	49th Congress
1976	Félix Flores Gómez	Institutional Revolutionary Party	1976–1979	50th Congress
1979	Adalberto Gómez Rodríguez	Institutional Revolutionary Party	1979–1982	51st Congress
1982	José Luis Peñaloza	Institutional Revolutionary Party	1982–1985	52nd Congress
1985	María Esther Scherman Leaño	Institutional Revolutionary Party	1985–1988	53rd Congress
1988	Silvano Urzúa Ochoa	National Action Party (Mexico)	1988–1991	54th Congress
1991	Adalberto Gómez Rodríguez	Institutional Revolutionary Party	1991–1994	55th Congress
1994	José de Jesús Sánchez Ochoa	National Action Party (Mexico)	1994–1997	56th Congress
1997	Leonardo García Camarena	National Action Party (Mexico)	1997–2000	57th Congress
2000	José María Tejeda Vázquez	National Action Party (Mexico)	2000–2003	58th Congress
2003	Ramón González González	National Action Party (Mexico)	2003–2006	59th Congress
2006	José Antonio Muñoz Serrano	National Action Party (Mexico)	2006–2009	60th Congress
2009	José Luis Íñiguez Gámez	National Action Party (Mexico)	2009–2012	61st Congress
2012	Cecilia González Gómez (Note: González Gómez was originally elected for the PVEM but switched to the PRI on 4 September 2012.)	Ecologist Green Party of Mexico Institutional Revolutionary Party	2012–2015	62nd Congress
2015	Elías Octavio Íñiguez Mejía	National Action Party (Mexico)	2015–2018	63rd Congress
2018	Guadalupe Romo Romo	National Action Party (Mexico)	2018–2021	64th Congress
2021	Desiderio Tinajero Robles	National Action Party (Mexico)	2021–2024	65th Congress
2024	José Mario Íñiguez Franco	National Action Party (Mexico)	2024–2027	66th Congress

== Presidential elections ==
Jalisco's 3rd district
Election	District won by	Party or coalition	%
2018	Ricardo Anaya Cortés	Por México al Frente	48.7597
2024	Bertha Xóchitl Gálvez Ruiz	Fuerza y Corazón por México	46.8061
