= 7th federal electoral district of Jalisco =

Federal electoral district of Mexico

Jalisco's 7th
- Electoral district of the Chamber of Deputies of Mexico

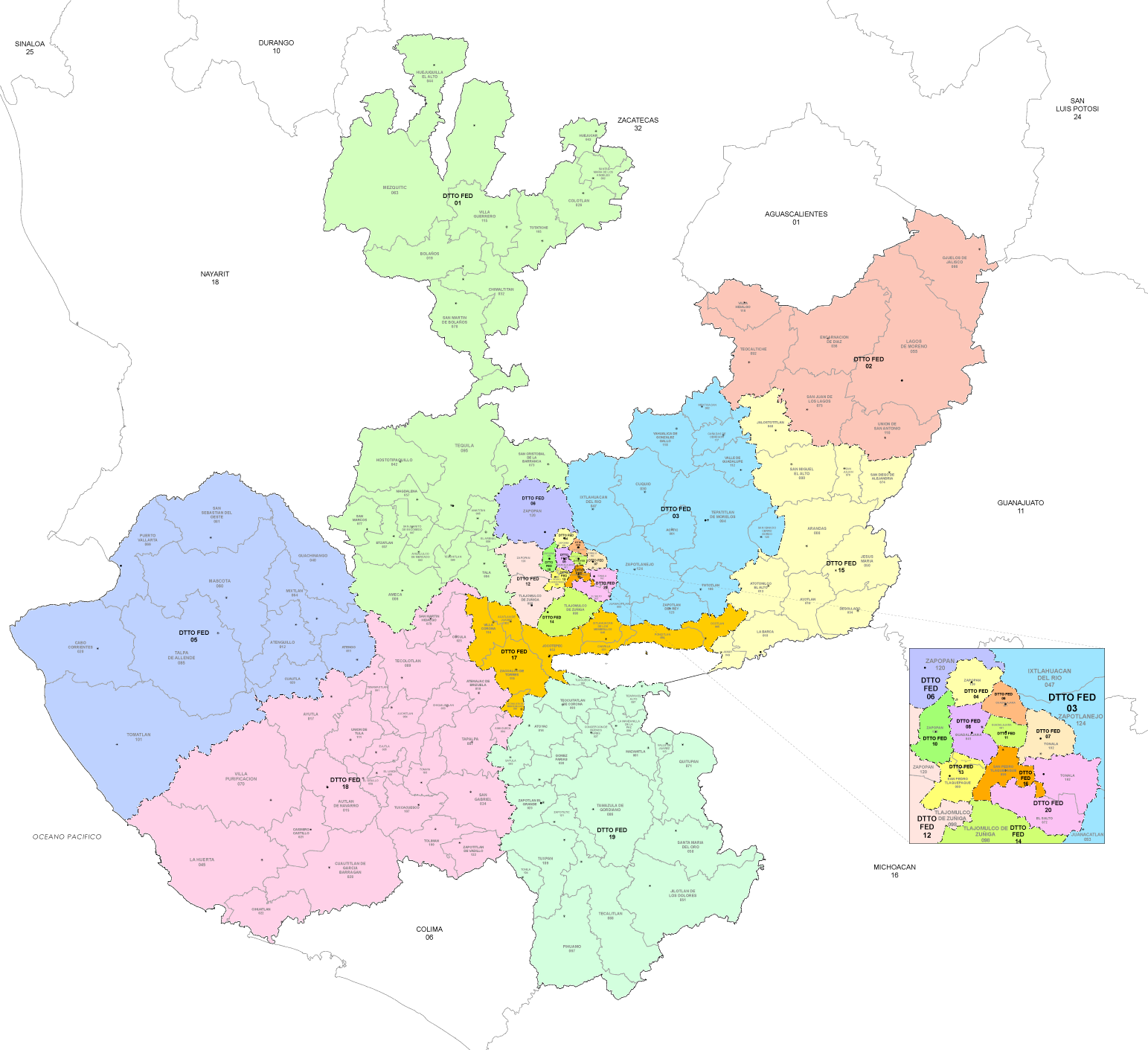
- 7th district

Incumbent
- Member: Claudia García Hernández
- Party: ▌Morena
- Congress: 66th (2024–2027)

District
- State: Jalisco
- Head town: Tonalá
- Coordinates: 20°37′N 103°14′W
- Covers: Municipality of Tonalá (bulk)
- PR region: First
- Precincts: 69
- Population: 399,701 (2020 census)

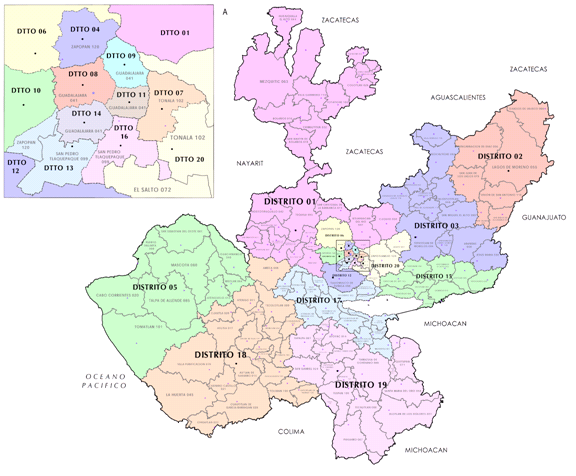
Jalisco's districts in 2017–2022

The 7th federal electoral district of Jalisco (Spanish: Distrito electoral federal 07 de Jalisco) is one of the 300 electoral districts into which Mexico is divided for elections to the federal Chamber of Deputies and one of 20 such districts in the state of Jalisco.

It elects one deputy to the lower house of Congress for each three-year legislative session by means of the first-past-the-post system. Votes cast in the district also count towards the calculation of proportional representation ("plurinominal") deputies elected from the first region.

The current member for the district, elected in the 2024 general election, is Claudia García Hernández of the National Regeneration Movement (Morena).

== District territory ==
Under the 2023 districting plan adopted by the National Electoral Institute (INE), which is to be used for the 2024, 2027 and 2030 federal elections, Jalisco's 7th district is located in the Guadalajara Metropolitan Area and comprises 69 electoral precincts (secciones electorales) in the northern portion of the municipality of Tonalá. (Note: The 20th district covers the municipality's remaining 26 precincts.)

The head town (cabecera distrital), where results from individual polling stations are gathered together and tallied, is the city of Tonalá. The district reported a population of 399,701 in the 2020 census.

== Previous districting schemes ==
Evolution of electoral district numbers
	1974	1978	1996	2005	2017	2023
Jalisco	13	20	19	19	20	20
Chamber of Deputies	196	300				

2017–2022

Jalisco regained its 20th congressional seat in the 2017 redistricting process. The 7th district's head town was at Tonalá and it covered 68 precincts in that municipality.

2005–2017

Under the 2005 plan, Jalisco had 19 districts. This district's head town was at Tonalá and it covered the whole of that municipality (81 precincts).

1996–2005

In the 1996 scheme, under which Jalisco lost a single-member seat, the district had its head town at Tonalá and it covered the whole of that municipality, together with Juanacatlán, El Salto and Zapotlanejo.

1978–1996

The districting scheme in force from 1978 to 1996 was the result of the 1977 electoral reforms, which increased the number of single-member seats in the Chamber of Deputies from 196 to 300. Under that plan, Jalisco's seat allocation rose from 13 to 20. The 7th district's head town was at Yahualica de González Gallo and it covered 11 municipalities in the east of the state:
- Arandas, Degollado, Jalostotitlán, Jesús María, San Diego de Alejandría, San Julián, San Miguel el Alto, Tepatitlán de Morelos, Valle de Guadalupe, Villa Obregón and Yahualica de González Gallo.

== Deputies returned to Congress ==
(Mexico) National parties
- Current
- PAN
- PRI
- PT
- PVEM
- MC
- Morena
- PAZ
- Somos
- Defunct or local only
- PLM
- PNR
- PRM
- PNM
- PP
- PPS
- PARM
- PFCRN
- CON
- PANAL
- PSD
- PES
- PES
- PRD

Jalisco's 7th district
Election	Deputy	Party	Term	Legislature
1916	Gaspar Bolaños		1916–1917	Constituent Congress of Querétaro
...
1976	María Refugio Castillón Coronado	Institutional Revolutionary Party	1976–1979	50th Congress
1979	Ignacio González Rubio Vergara	Institutional Revolutionary Party	1979–1982	51st Congress
1982	José Rosas Gómez Luna	Institutional Revolutionary Party	1982–1985	52nd Congress
1985	Alejandro Ontiveros Gómez	Institutional Revolutionary Party	1985–1988	53rd Congress
1988	Juan Enrique Ibarra Pedroza	Institutional Revolutionary Party	1988–1991	54th Congress
1991	José Socorro Velázquez Hernández	Institutional Revolutionary Party	1991–1994	55th Congress
1994	Horacio Alejandro Gutiérrez Bravo	National Action Party (Mexico)	1994–1997	56th Congress
1997	Felipe Jarero Escobedo	National Action Party (Mexico)	1997–2000	57th Congress
2000	Jaime Aceves Pérez	National Action Party (Mexico)	2000–2003	58th Congress
2003	Modesta Vázquez Vázquez	Institutional Revolutionary Party	2003–2006	59th Congress
2006	Carlos René Sánchez Gil	National Action Party (Mexico)	2006–2009	60th Congress
2009	Jorge Arana Arana	Institutional Revolutionary Party	2009–2012	61st Congress
2012	Sergio Armando Chávez Dávalos	Institutional Revolutionary Party	2012–2015	62nd Congress
2015	Laura Nereida Plascencia Pacheco	Institutional Revolutionary Party	2015–2018	63rd Congress
2018	Juan Carlos Villarreal Salazar (Note: Originally elected for the Citizens' Movement, Villarreal broke with the party on 3 February 2021 and sat as an independent thereafter.)	Citizens' Movement (Mexico) Independent politician	2018–2021	64th Congress
2021	Alberto Villa Villegas	National Regeneration Movement	2021–2024	65th Congress
2024	Claudia García Hernández	National Regeneration Movement	2024–2027	66th Congress

== Presidential elections ==
Jalisco's 7th district
Election	District won by	Party or coalition	%
2018	Andrés Manuel López Obrador	Juntos Haremos Historia	47.8394
2024	Claudia Sheinbaum Pardo	Sigamos Haciendo Historia	54.3059
