= Mitic =

Mitic may refer to:

- Mitić, Serbian surname
- Mitic, Jalisco, Mexican village
