= José Luis Íñiguez Gámez =

Mexican politician

- Born: 3 October 1978 (age 47); Yahualica de González Gallo, Jalisco, Mexico
- Occupation: Politician
- Political party: PAN

José Luis Íñiguez Gámez (born 3 October 1978) is a Mexican politician from the National Action Party (PAN). In the 2009 mid-terms he was elected to the Chamber of Deputies to represent Jalisco's 3rd district during the 61st session of Congress.
