= Melly Barajas Cárdenas =

Mexican tequila distiller

Melly Barajas Cárdenas is a Mexican master distiller of tequila. As of 2018 she was one of only 12 female master distillers in Mexico. According to La Opinión she is known in Mexico as the Queen of Tequila.

== Early life ==
Barajas Cárdenas is from Guadalajara. Sometime in the 1990s, while working there as a teacher and clothing designer, she vacationed with her father in Mazamitla, where the family owned a home, and they discussed the fact Europe had recently granted appellation of origin of tequila to Mexico and his own desire to have a tequila with his name on it. Barajas Cárdenas interpreted this as something she could make happen and started looking for a distillery that would produce a few bottles, but as she investigated the industry she became interested. In 2019 she recalled, "I thought it was going to be like a little gift of a few thousand pesos to make his bottles and that he could drink them with his friends, but it turned into something more."

Barajas Cárdenas left her two jobs and began to work on formally entering the industry as a producer. In 1999, when she was about 22, Barajas Cárdenas opened the distillery Raza Azteca in Valle de Guadalupe, Jalisco, operated by her umbrella company Vinos y Licores Azteca. Eventually Barajas Cárdenas was also able to buy her own agave fields.

Barajas Cárdenas' distillery famously produces the tequila brand La Gritona, owned by Andy Coronado.

== Company ==
The company produces three house brands of tequila and several for other tequila brands. The company employs mostly women and produces tequila using traditional methods which extend the process from the hours in commercial production to a week. Agave, tequila's main ingredients, is roasted in masonry ovens, and fermentation is allowed to happen naturally. According to Barajas Cárdenas, as of 2019 the distillery produced 3000 liters per day.

== Reception ==
According to tequila writer M.A. Morales, Barajas Cárdenas is one of only a few Master Distillers importing to the United States four award-winning tequila labels simultaneously.
