= Cecilia González Gómez =

Mexican politician (1961–2017)

State Deputy of the Congress of Jalisco by proportional representation
- In office November 1, 2015 – January 3, 2017
- Succeeded by: Eduardo Pulido Cárdenas (interim)

Federal Deputy of the Congress of the Union for Jalisco's 3rd district
- In office September 1, 2012 – August 31, 2015
- Preceded by: José Luis Íñíguez Gámez
- Succeeded by: Elías Íñíguez Mejía

Municipal President of Tepatitlán de Morelos
- In office January 1, 2010 – March 25, 2012
- Preceded by: Miguel Franco Barba
- Succeeded by: Jorge Luis Rodríguez Gómez

Personal details
- Born: 28 May 1961 Tepatitlán, Jalisco, Mexico
- Died: 3 January 2017 (aged 55) Atlacomulco, State of Mexico, Mexico
- Party: Institutional Revolutionary Party

Cecilia González Gómez (28 May 1961 – 3 January 2017) was a Mexican politician affiliated with the Institutional Revolutionary Party (PRI). She served as municipal president of Tepatitlán, Jalisco, as a federal deputy in the 62nd Congress, and as a state deputy in the Congress of Jalisco.

== Personal life ==
González was born in Tepatitlán in 1961 held a technical degree in tourism, along with additional formations in interpersonal relations, art history, urbanism and policy. In 1978, she was crowned Señorita Tepabril in the city's

González joined the PRI in 1980 while she developed her career as a businesswoman as president of Altos y Turismo S.A. de C.V. and, later, partner and board member of Productos Alimenticios La Guadalupana. She was a member of the Chamber of Commerce of Tepatitlán and was affiliated with the Altos de Jalisco chapter of Coparmex, Mexico's national employer's association.

== Political career ==
González first became actively involved in politics in 1988, when she was became a member of the local PRI chapter's Policy Board. Between 2008 and 2009, she served as Technical Secretary for the local Policy Board; in this role, she emerged as a potential candidate for the 2009 mayoral elections.

In 2009, González ran as the PRI's candidate in a traditionally PAN-dominated municipality, forming a coalition with Nueva Alianza. The ticket was elected with 55% of the vote, becoming the first woman to be elected to the position. During her tenure as municipal president, she was credited with igniting negotiations with the state government to build the El Salto–Tepatitlán aqueduct, one of the city's most important public infrastructure projects in modern history. On March 25, 2023, she stepped down from the role to run for Jalisco's 3rd congressional district in the 2012 federal elections.

During the 2012 elections, González ran as the candidate for the Commitment to Mexico coalition for Jalisco's 3rd congressional district, representing the PRI and the Ecologist Green Party of Mexico (PVEM). The election, conducted under a FPTP system, saw the coalition win the seat with 42.7% of the votes. She joined the 62nd Congress on September 1, 2012, as a member of the PVEM caucus, but joined her own party three days later. During her term in office, González served on several Chamber of Deputies committees, including as president of the Center for the Study of Public Finances, secretary of the Competitiveness and the Clean Water and Sanitation committees, and member of the Tourism, Food Affairs, and Water Resources committees. As a member of the governing PRI party, she was one of the federal deputies closest to the Atlacomulco Group, which included then president, Enrique Peña Nieto.

During the 2015 midterm elections, González was included in PRI's party list for a plurinominal seat in the state Congress. She was elected and sworn in as a State Deputy on November 1, 2015.

== Death and legacy ==
In late 2016, she began facing recurring health issues, leading to her being hospitalized in Mexico City in early December for pulmonary issues. While traveling to Atlacomulco, State of Mexico, for a medical appointment on January 3, 2017, González suffered a heart attack. She died shortly after, aged 55.

On January 4, 2017, the Congress of Jalisco held an solemn session for González at the Legislative Palace in Guadalajara, attended by State Deputies as well as the Secretary of the State Government and the President of the state Supreme Court. González's casket was present for the service, which included a guard of honour. This session was followed by a similar service and funeral mass in Tepatitlán.
