= José Antonio Muñoz Serrano =

Mexican politician (born 1967)

- Born: 12 August 1967 (age 58); Tepatitlán de Morelos, Jalisco, Mexico
- Occupation: Politician
- Political party: PAN

José Antonio Muñoz Serrano (born 12 August 1967) is a Mexican politician affiliated with the National Action Party (PAN). In the 2006 general election he was elected to the Chamber of Deputies to represent Jalisco's 3rd district during the 60th session of Congress.
