= List of municipal presidents of Tonalá, Jalisco =

Following is a list of municipal presidents of Tonalá, in the Mexican state of Jalisco:

Term	Municipal president	Political party	Notes
1954 – 1955-12-31	J. Jesús Álvarez Pérez	PRI	
1956-01-01 – 1958-12-31	Nicolás Gabriel Parra	PRI	
1959-01-01 – 1961-12-31	Brígido Sandoval Ramos	PRI	
1962-01-01 – 1964-12-31	Isidoro Ramos Bautista	PRI	
1965-01-01 – 1967-12-31	Pascual Aldana Martínez	PRI	
1968-01-01 – 1970-12-31	Francisco Hernández Langarica	PRI	
1971-01-01 – 1973-12-31	Francisco Oliva Lemus	PRI	
1974-01-01 – 1976-12-31	Pascual Cecilio Aldana González	PRI	
1977-01-01 – 1979-12-31	Hilario Puga Decenas	PRI	
1980-01-01 – 1982-12-31	Juan Coral Vega	PRI	
1983-01-01 – 1985-12-31	Marcos Arana Cervantes	PRI	
1986-01-01 – 1988-12-31	Melquiades Preciado Partida	PRI	
1989–1992	Vidal Maestro Murguía	PRI	
1992–1995	J. Timoteo Campechano Silva	PRI	
1995–1997	Felipe Jarero Escobedo	PAN	
1997	Guillermo López Mateos	PAN	Acting municipal president
1997	Angelita García Beato	PAN	Acting municipal president
1998-01-01 – 2000	Jorge Arana Arana	PRI	
2000 – 2000-12-31	Juan Lara Lucano	PRI	Acting municipal president
2001-01-01 – 2003-12-31	Vicente Vargas López	PRI	
2004-01-01 – 2006-12-31	Palemón García Real	PRI	
2007-01-01 – 2007-12-20	Jorge Luis Vizcarra Mayorga	PAN	His political immunity was removed
2007-12-21 – 2008-02-26	Salvador González del Toro	PAN	Substitute
2008-02-27 – 2009-09-03	Emanuel Agustín Ordóñez Hernández	PAN	Acting municipal president
2009-09-04 – 2009-12-31	Jorge Luis Vizcarra Mayorga	PAN	Resumed
2010-01-01 – 2012-09-30	Juan Antonio Mateos Nuño	PRI	
2012-10-01 – 2015-09-30	Jorge Arana Arana	PRI	
2015-10-01 – 2018-09-30	Sergio Armando Chávez Dávalos	PRI	
2018-10-01 – 2021-09-30	Juan Antonio González Mora	MC	
2021-10-01 – 2024-02-29	Sergio Armando Chávez Dávalos	Morena	He was elected on 6 June 2021. Applied for a leave in order to seek reelection
2024-03-01 – 2024	Francisco Javier Reyes Ruiz	Morena	Acting municipal president
2024-10-01 –	Sergio Armando Chávez Dávalos	Morena	He was reelected
