= Fencer =

Fencer may refer to:

- Fencer, a person who participates in the sport of fencing
- Fencer, a person who makes fences
- Fencer, the device which energizes an electric fence
- Fencer, the NATO reporting name of the Sukhoi Su-24 combat jet
- HMS Fencer (D64)
- The Fencer (Finnish: Miekkailija), a 2015 Estonian-Finnish-German film directed by Klaus Härö

== See also ==
- Fence (disambiguation)
