= Cañadas de Obregón =

- Municipality and Town
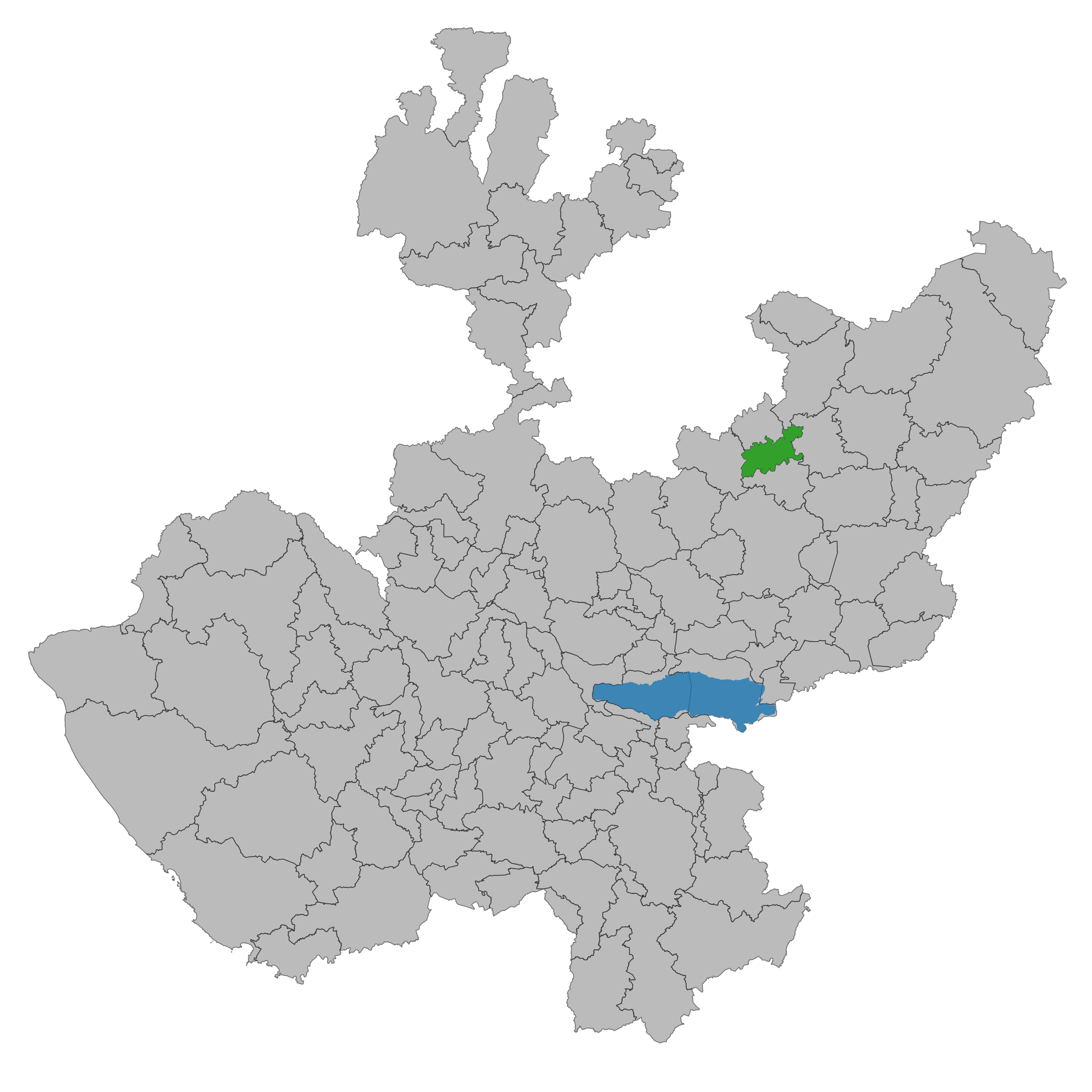
- Location of the municipality in Jalisco

- Location in Mexico
- Coordinates: 21°08′58.43″N 102°41′19.13″W
- Country: Mexico
- State: Jalisco

Area
  - Total: 271.8 km^{2} (104.9 sq mi)
  - Town: 2.09 km^{2} (0.81 sq mi)

Population (2020 census)
  - Total: 4,388
  - Density: 16.14/km^{2} (41.81/sq mi)
  - Town: 3,024
  - Town density: 1,450/km^{2} (3,750/sq mi)
  - Religions: Roman Catholic Church

Cañadas de Obregón is a town and municipality, in Jalisco in central-western Mexico. It is located in the Altos Sur Region. The municipality covers an area of 182.09 square miles (271.8 km^{2}).

It has always been a small town, which firstly was called Cañadas ("Glens"). In 1929 his name was changed to Villa Obregón (Obregón Village), in honor to Mexican president Álvaro Obregón (assassinated on July 17, 1928, in Mexico City). However, on January 10, 1980, it again changed its name, this time to Cañadas de Obregón, partially recovering its original name.

As of 2005, the municipality had a total population of 3,978.

The population of the municipality has decreased due to emigration, generally to the United States. Their main sources of economic income are agriculture and remittances sent by their fellow citizens residing in the United States.

In 2023, the town of Temacapulín, within the Cañadas de Obregón municipality, was designated a Pueblo Mágico by the Mexican government, recognizing its cultural and historical importance.

== History ==
Before the Spanish conquest of the Aztec Empire, this region was included within the dominion of Coinan and its inhabitants were from the Nahuas tribes. The conquest was carried out by Pedro Almíndez Chirino at the beginning of 1530, sent by Nuño de Guzmán. Chirinos arrived at the place destroying and setting fire to everything in his path. After him, Cristóbal de Oñate arrived, and observed a behavior opposite to that of the first, getting the provinces to present obedience to the Spanish Crown.

By decree number 1016 of October 1, 1903, it became a municipality, and by decree number 3577 of March 2, 1929, its name was changed to Villa Obregón in memory of revolutionary leader Álvaro Obregón. Since 1825, it belonged to the Third Canton of La Barca, and since 1872, to the 11th Canton of Teocaltiche. As of that date, it included the commissaryships of Cañadas, Valle de Guadalupe, Catachimé, Los Yugos, Rancho de Abajo, Laguna de Santa Gertrudis, and El Ejido.

== Geography ==
=== Location ===
Cañadas de Obregón is located in the northeast of Jalisco, between coordinates 21º06'40" and 21º13'30" North latitude, and 102º33'40" and 102º45'00" West longitude; at a height of 6,070 feet above sea level (1,850 meters above sea level).

The municipality borders to the North with the municipalities of Mexticacán and Jalostotitlán; to the East with the municipalities of Jalostotitlán and Valle de Guadalupe; to the South with the municipalities of Valle de Guadalupe and Yahualica de González Gallo; to the West with the municipalities of Yahualica de González Gallo and Mexticacán.

=== Topography ===
Most of its surface is made up of semi-flat areas (61%), flat areas (34%); the remaining areas (5%) are hilly.

==== Soil ====
The territory is made up of lands that belong to the Quaternary period. The composition of the soils is predominantly haplic feozem, chromic luvisol and eutric regosol. The municipality has a land area of 116,536 acres (47,162 hectares), of which 20,608 acres (8,340 hectares) are used for agricultural purposes, 80,608 (32,622) for livestock activities, 5,436 (2,200) are for forestry use, 304 (123) are urban land, and 5201 (2,105) have other uses; the use of the remainder 4,379 (1,772), was not specified. As far as property is concerned, an area of 108,117 (43,755) is private, and another of 4,040 (1,635) is ejidal land; there is no communal property.

=== Hydrography ===
The municipality of Cañadas de Obregón belongs to the Lerma-Chapala-Santiago hydrological basin, and also to the Rio Verde-Grande de Belén sub-basin. Its hydrological resources are provided by the following rivers: Verde, La Laja, Jalostotitlán, and San Miguel. There are some brooks: El Salto, La Paleta, El Saltillo, and Salitre. It has hot springs in Temacapulín.

=== Climate ===
The climate is semi-dry, with dry Autumn, Winter and Spring, and warm, with no well-defined winter thermal change. The mean annual temperature is 67 °F (19 °C), with a maximum of 82 °F (28 °C), and a minimum of 52 °F (11 °C). The rainfall regime lasts during June and July, with an average rainfall of 55.2 millimeters. The annual average of days with frost is 16.5. The prevailing winds are in the direction of the Southwest.

=== Flora and fauna ===
Its flora is mainly composed of oak, nopal, huisache, palo dulce, and grassland. Its fauna is made up of rabbits, hares, opossums, deer, and other minor species.

== Economy ==
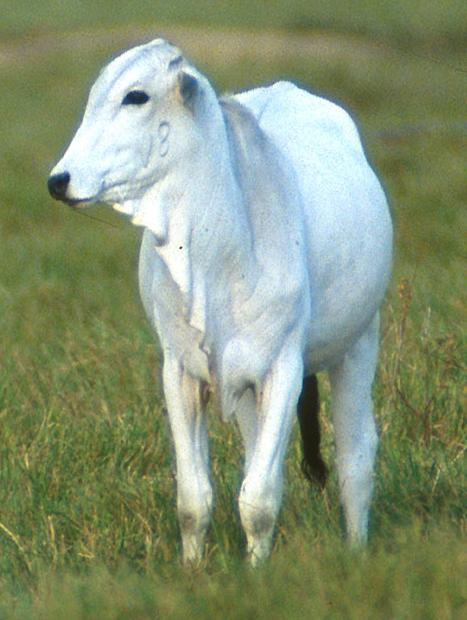
Cattle is raised in the municipality.

45.82% of the inhabitants is dedicated to the primary sector, 25.33% to secondary sector, 26.74% to tertiary sector, and the rest is not specified. 29.02% is economically active. The main economic activities are: agriculture, fishing, livestock, commerce and industry.

- Agriculture: corn, beans and chile are grown.
- Livestock: cattle, pigs, and sheep are raised.
- Tourism: it has architectural and natural attractions.
- Commerce: has restaurants, markets and shops. The sale of basic necessities and mixed shops that sell various items predominate.
- Services: technical, communal, personal and maintenance services are provided.
- Fishing: catfish and carp are fished.
- Fish farming: tilapia, catfish, carp, and frog farms.
- Industry: manufacturing and handicraft industries stand out.

== Infrastructure ==
- Education

87.07% of the population is literate, of which 32.20% has completed elementary education. The municipality has three preschool schools, 14 primary, 2 secondaries and one preparatory.

- Health

Health care is taken care of by the State Secretary of Health and private doctors. The System for the Integral Development of the Family (Desarrollo Integral de la Familia, DIF) is in charge of social welfare.

- Sports

It has sports centers, where are played: soccer, basketball, international fronton, baseball, athletics, and volleyball. It also has a cultural center, a plaza, a cinema, parks, a 1680 bullring, gardens and a library.

- Housing

It has 1,130 homes, which are generally private. 92.21% have electricity service, 73.01% have drainage and drinking water service. Its construction is generally based on brick, adobe, and concrete.

- Services

The municipality has drinking water, sewerage, public lighting, markets, flea markets, cemeteries, public cleaning, public safety, parks, gardens and sports centers.

86.9% of the inhabitants have potable water; 72.4% sewerage, and 95.1% electrical energy.

- Media and communication channels

It has mail service, telegraph, telephone, radiotelephony service. Transportation is carried out through the Guadalajara-San Luis Potosí highway. It has a network of rural roads that connect the localities; transportation is done in public buses, taxis, and family cars.

== Demographics ==
According to the 2010 Population and Housing Census, the municipality has 4,152 inhabitants, of which 2,015 are men and 2,137 are women; 0.65% of the population is indigenous.

Demographic evolution of the Municipality of Cañadas de Obregón
1980	1990	2000	2005
5,983	5,177	4,407	3,978

=== Religion ===
99.08% profess the Catholic religion, there are also believers of Jehovah's Witnesses, protestants and Rastafaris. 0.51% of the inhabitants claimed not to practice any religion.

=== Localities ===
The municipality has a total of 34 localities, of which the main ones and the population they have are the following:

Locality	Population
Total municipality	4,152
Cañadas de Obregón	2,625
Temacapulín	332
El Zapotillo	218
La Cueva (Santa Rosalia de la Cueva)	181
Los Yugos	155

== Culture ==
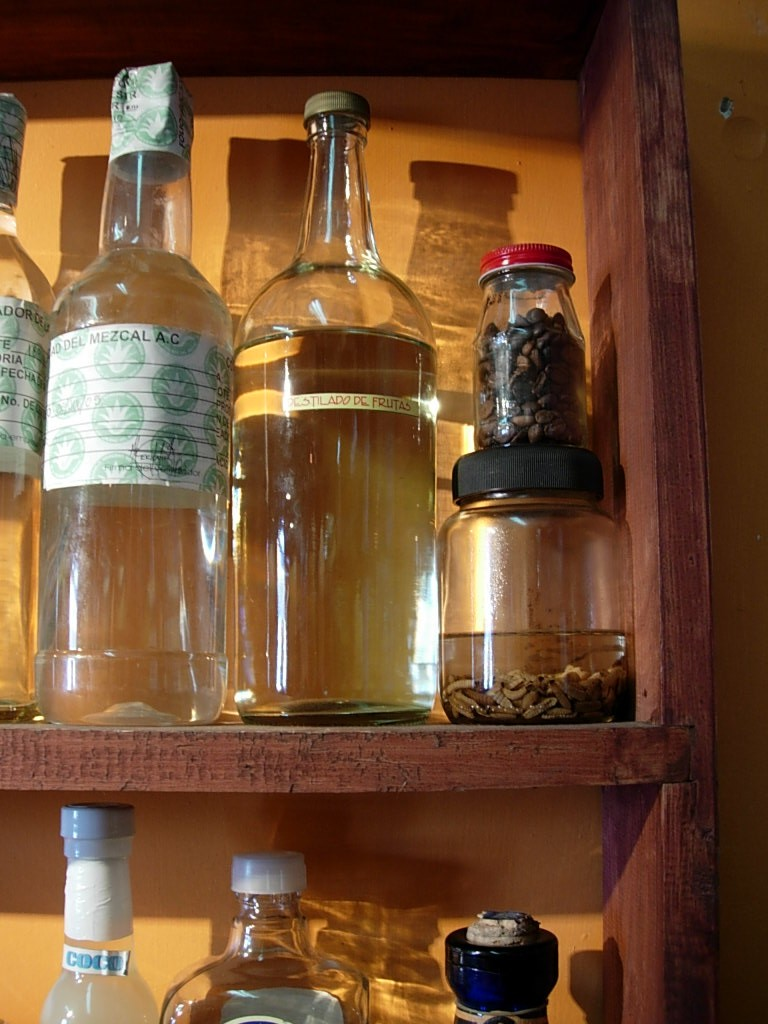
Mezcal.

- Crafts: embroidered articles, pottery, and furniture.
- Typical costumes: charro costume.
- Gastronomy: pozole, jocoque and fish cooked on stalks of maguey stand out; of their drinks, tequila and mezcal.

=== Sites of interest ===
- Parish of Our Lady of Light, dates from the 18th century.
- Parish of Our Lady of the Remedies.
- Lateran Basilica of Temacapulín, dates from the 18th century.
- City Hall.
- Rodolfo Gaona Bullring, built in 1680.
- El Pandito Forest.
- Potrerillos Forest.
- El Laurel Forest.

=== Feasts ===
- Candlemas: from January 24 to February 5.
- Virgin of the Light: from May 16 to 18.
- Popular festivals: January 23.
- Feast of Our Lady of Guadalupe, from December 4 to 12.
- National holidays, September 15 and 16.
- Day of the Dead, November 2.
- Festivities in honor of the Christ of Goodness (Summer Festival) from the last Sunday in July to the first Sunday in August.

=== Notable people ===
- José Leopoldo González González, first bishop of the Diocese of Nogales, Sonora.

== Government ==
The form of government is democratic and depends on Jalisco state government, and federal government. Elections are held every three years, when the municipal president and her/his council are elected.

=== Municipal presidents ===
Term	Municipal president	Political party	Notes
1908–1910	Jesús Jaime		
1910–1919	Calixto Alcalá		
1919–1929	Teódulo García		
1929–1930	Librado Gutiérrez Chávez	PNR	
1929	Rosario Ramírez	PNR	
1930	Jesús Loza Mercado	PNR	
1930	Juan Gómez Covarrubias	PNR	
1931	Santos Padilla Gómez	PNR	
1932	Leopoldo Lomelí Loza	PNR	
1933	Feliciano Gómez Gómez	PNR	
1934–1935	Feliciano Jiménez Hernández	PNR	
1936	Juan Jiménez Gallo	PNR	
1937–1938	Francisco Oropeza Jáuregui	PNR	
1938–1939	Feliciano Jiménez Hernández	PRM	
1940	Fermín Loza Martínez	PRM	
1944	Tomás González Martínez	PRM	
1945–1946	Procopio Domínguez Gutiérrez	PRM	
1947	J. Guadalupe González Gómez	PRI	
1949–1950	Maxemín Gómez Gutiérrez	PRI	
1951–1952	Elías Jiménez Gómez	PRI	
1953–1955	Cesáreo Márquez Muñoz	PRI	
1956–1958	Bernardo Íñiguez Íñiguez	PRI	
1959–1961	Baudelio Jiménez Gómez	PRI	
1962–1964	Bonfilio Gómez Rodríguez	PRI	
1965–1967	José González Padilla	PRI	
1968–1970	Arturo Martínez González	PRI	
1971–1973	Heliodoro Valdivia Ramírez	PRI	
1974–1976	Jorge Lomelí Vallejo	PRI	
1977–1979	María Ever González Vallejo	PRI	
1980–1982	Agustín Ruesga Gallardo	PRI	
1983–1985	J. Jesús Carranza Rodríguez	PRI	
1986–1988	J. Santos Padilla González	PRI	
1989–1992	José Santos González Valdivia	PRI	
1992–1995	María Martina Márquez Loza	PRI	
1995–1997	José Santos González Valdivia	PRI	
1997	Alfredo Carvajal Jáuregui	PRI	Acting municipal president
1998–2000	Rosalío Álvarez Ibarra	PRI	
2001–2003	Samuel Carvajal Jáuregui	PRI	
2004–2006	Rosendo Martínez Padilla	PAN	
2006–2009	José de Jesús Sáenz Muñoz	PAN	
2010–2012	Carlos González Padilla	PRI	
2013–2015	Juan Gabriel Ramírez Becerra	PRI	
2015–2018	Jaime Gustavo Casillas Vázquez	PRI	
2018–2021	Reynaldo González Gómez	PAN; PRD; MC	
01/10/2021–	Miguel Oropeza Ruvalcaba	PVEM	
