= Jalisco State Highway 225 =

Highway in Mexico

State Highway 225
- Carretera estatal 225

Route information
- Maintained by State of Jalisco
- Length: 11 km (6.8 mi) 10 km (6.2 mi) westbound
- Existed: ca. 1995–present

Major junctions
- West end: Huisquilco, Jalisco
- JAL 238 near San Isidro, Jalisco; JAL AUX 225 near El Durazno, Jalisco
- East end: Yahualica de González Gallo, Jalisco

Location
- Country: Mexico
- State: Jalisco

Highway system
- Mexican Federal Highways; List; Autopistas

Jalisco State Highway 69 (JAL 225) is a 10–11-kilometre-long (6.2–6.8 mi) east–west state route between the towns of Yahualica de González Gallo and Huisquilco, Jalisco, Mexico.
