= San Gaspar de los Reyes =

Human settlement in Mexico

Coordinates: 21°17′N 102°30′W

San Gaspar de los Reyes (known as San Gaspar or SanGas) is a town that makes up an important part of the Jalostotitlan Municipality in central Mexico. The population was 868 according to the 2020 census.

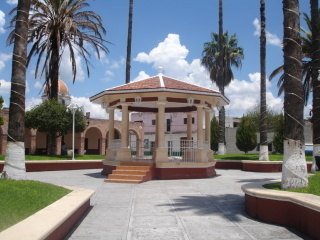
The kiosco in the plaza at sangas -hernan gallo

It is a historic town founded in 1590 that also played a focal part in the Cristero uprising during the tail end of the Mexican revolutionary war of the early part of the 20th century. San Gaspar de los Reyes is made up of a small community that has strong ties to the United States due to its large number of immigrants originating from this town. The current local economy is primarily made up of some local services and small markets selling local and organic goods; however, the greatest influx of capital comes from outside resources including US dollars sent from family members working abroad, as well as from local textile and service industry employees that commute to the neighboring towns Jalostotitlan, San Juan de los Lagos, and Teocaltiche. The economy booms during festival periods, primarily on January 6, celebration of the Epiphany, and May 24, celebration of its patron saint, Maria Auxiliadora.

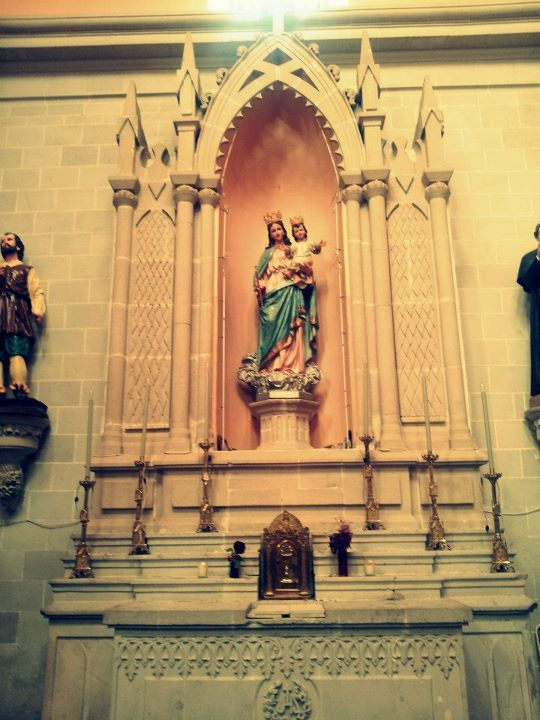
La patrona de Sangas: María Auxiliadora -hernan gallo

Historic references of business include textiles and manufacturing as well as current farming and ranching. The famous Rio Verde runs along the edge of town. Part of this river was recently considered to be dammed for energy services, though doing so would have inundated San Gaspar and its neighboring communities. However, pressure from the local population with assistance from the San Gaspar community now residing in the United States pushed for the Mexican government to consider alternative construction sites - thus saving this community.
