= Ramón González González =

Mexican politician (born 1962)

- Born: 18 May 1962 (age 64); Guadalajara, Jalisco, Mexico
- Occupation: Politician
- Political party: PAN

Ramón González González (born 18 May 1962) is a Mexican politician affiliated with the National Action Party (PAN). In the 2003 mid-terms he was elected to the Chamber of Deputies to represent Jalisco's 3rd district during the 59th session of Congress.
