= Sergio Armando Chávez Davalos =

Mexican politician (born 1974)

- Born: 31 October 1974 (age 51)
- Occupation: Politician
- Political party: MORENA

Sergio Armando Chávez Dávalos (born 31 October 1974) in Tonalá, Jalisco, México, is a Mexican politician affiliated with the Institutional Revolutionary Party (PRI). In the 2012 general election he was elected to the Chamber of Deputies to represent Jalisco's 7th district during the 62nd session of Congress. He also served in the Chamber during the 59th session.

The municipal president of Tonalá, Jalisco, for the 2024-2027 administration, is Sergio Armando Chávez Dávalos. He presides over the current municipal government of Tonalá, along with his team of officials and council members.
