= San Nicolás de las Flores =

San Nicolás de las Flores is a city in Jalostotitlán, Jalisco, Mexico. San Nicolás is located at 21°17′26″N 102°33′05″W and sits at an altitude of 1,665 meters (5,463 ft) above sea level. The population was 331 at the 2020 census.

== Economy ==
The main activities in the municipality are agriculture, cattle-farming, and the services industry.
