= Jaime Aceves Pérez =

Mexican politician (born 1961)

- Born: 2 September 1961 (age 64); Guadalajara, Jalisco, Mexico
- Occupation: Politician
- Political party: PAN

Jaime Aceves Pérez (born 2 September 1961) is a Mexican politician from the National Action Party (PAN). In the 2000 general election he was elected to the Chamber of Deputies to represent Jalisco's 7th district during the 58th session of Congress.

He studied law at the Universidad Veracruzana and mechanical engineering/communications at the University of Guadalajara.
