= Carlos René Sánchez Gil =

Mexican politician (born 1958)

- Born: 26 September 1958 (age 67); Jalisco, Mexico
- Occupation: Politician
- Political party: PAN

Carlos René Sánchez Gil (born 26 September 1958) is a Mexican politician affiliated with the National Action Party (PAN). In the 2006 general election he was elected to the Chamber of Deputies to represent Jalisco's 7th district during the 60th session of Congress.
