= Fence (disambiguation) =

A fence is a barrier enclosing or bordering a field, yard, etc., usually made of posts and wire or wood, used to prevent entrance, to confine, or to mark a boundary.

Fence or fences may also refer to:

== Entertainment ==
=== Music ===
- Fences (band), an American rock band
- Fences (song), a song by Blanche
- "Fence", a song from Everything Everywhere All at Once (soundtrack)
- "Fences", a song on Paramore's 2007 album Riot!
- "Fences", a song by Phoenix from the 2009 album Wolfgang Amadeus Phoenix

=== Other media ===
- Fence (magazine), an American literary magazine
- Fences (play), a 1987 Pulitzer Prize-winning play by August Wilson
  - Fences (film), a 2016 film adaptation of the play, starring Denzel Washington and Viola Davis, and directed by Washington
- Fence (comic book)
- The Fence (film), a 2025 English-language French drama
- Slitherlink or Fences, a logic puzzle published by Nikoli

== Places ==
- Fence, Wisconsin, a town in the United States
- Fence (community), Wisconsin, an unincorporated community in the United States
- Fence, Lancashire, a village in England

== Science and technology ==
- Fence (mathematics), a type of set
- Air Force Space Surveillance System, nicknamed "Space Fence"
- Chesterton's fence, a philosophical concept concerning progress

=== Computing ===
- Fence instruction, instruction constraining memory operations
- Fencing (computing), isolating a malfunctioning node
- Fences (software)
- Fenced code blocks in Markdown

== Other uses ==
- Fence (criminal), dealer in the purchase and sale of stolen property
- Fence (finance), a combination of financial instruments used to protect an investor against adverse price movements
- Fence (woodworking), portion of a tool used as a guide
- Chumra (Judaism) or "building a fence around the Torah", a prohibition or obligation in Jewish practice
- Fencing response, an unnatural position of the arms following a concussion.

== See also ==
- Fence lizard (disambiguation), two species of spiny lizard
