= Mitic, Jalisco =

Coordinates: 21°16′N 102°27′W

Church at Mitic

Mitic is a town located within the municipality of Jalostotitlán in Los Altos region of the Mexican state of Jalisco. It has a population of 33, 19 men and 14 women.

== History ==
The residents of the area were mostly from the Tecuexe tribe.
