= Jalostotitlán =

- Municipality and city
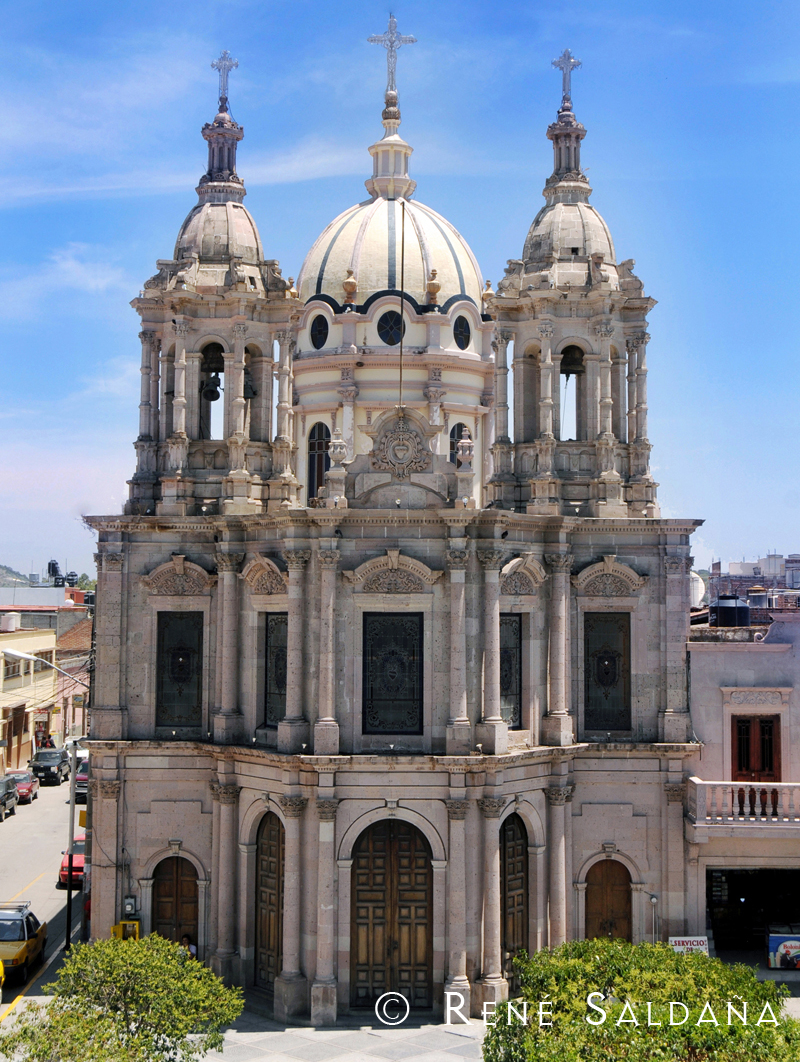

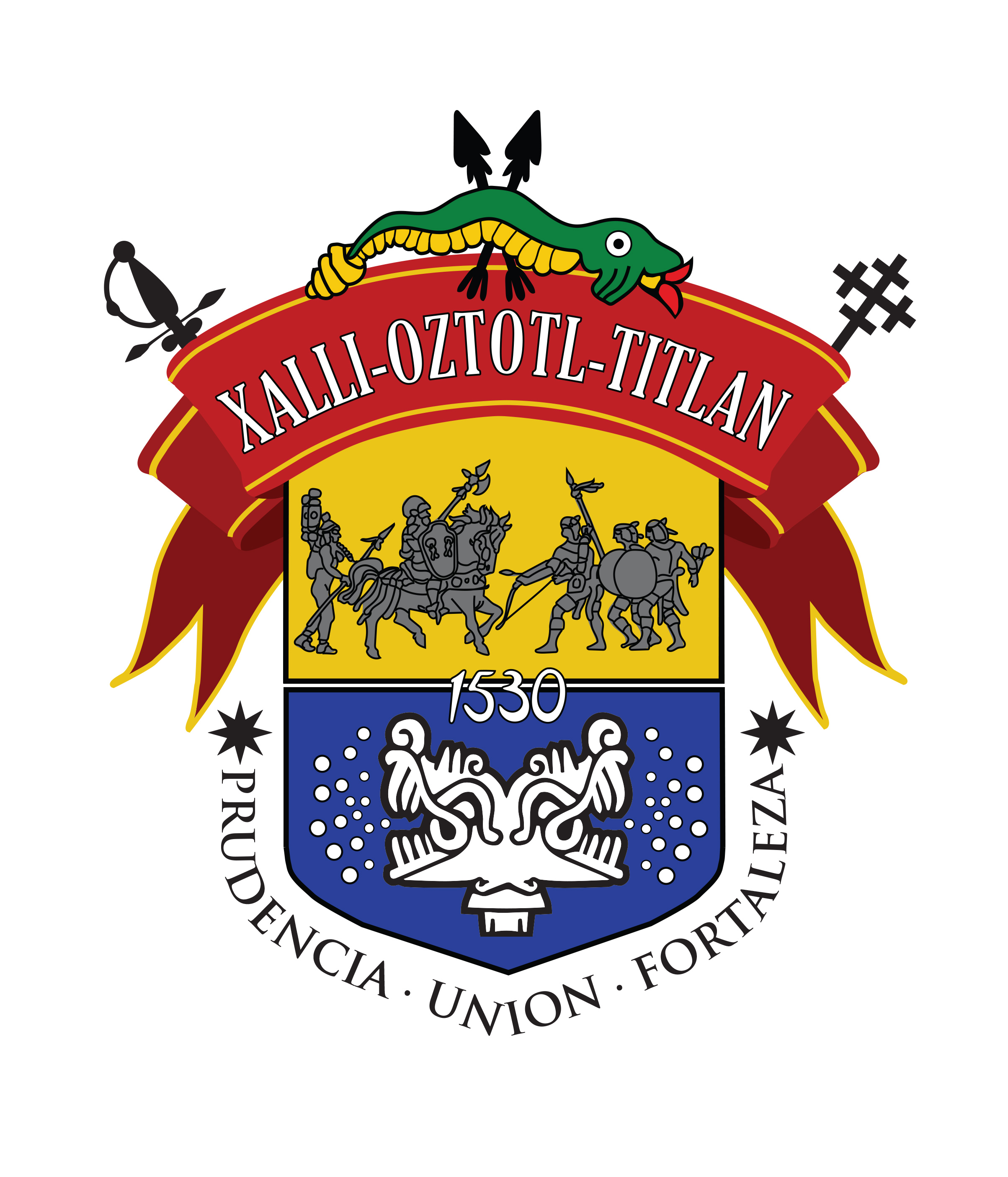
- Coat of arms
- Etymology: "place of sandy caves; place of caves from which sand is drawn" in Nahuatl
- Nicknames: El Corazón de los Altos de Jalisco, Jalos
- Motto: Prudencia-union-fortaleza
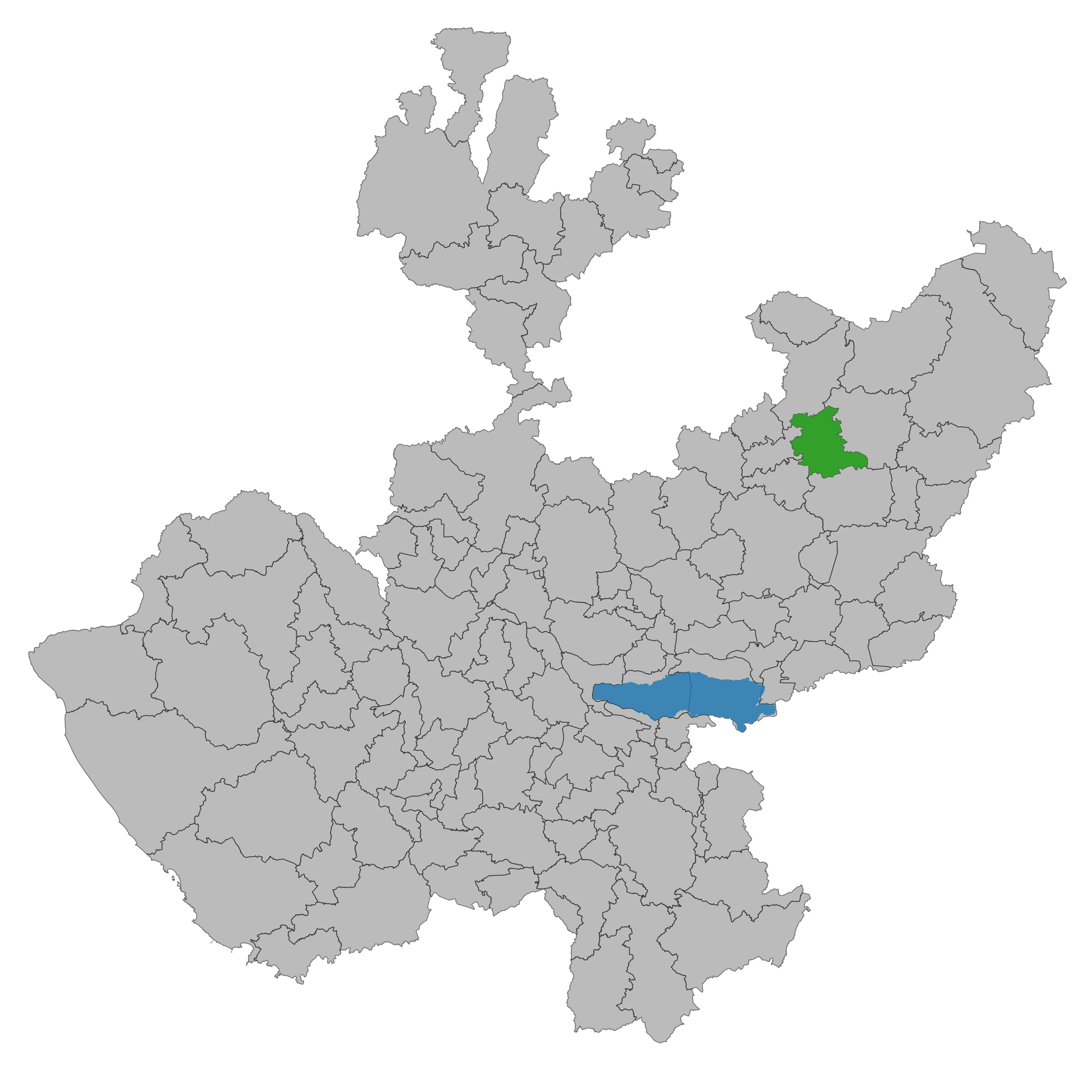
- Location in Jalisco

- Location in Mexico
- Coordinates: 21°10′N 102°28′W
- Country: Mexico
- State: Jalisco
- Municipality: Jalostotitlán
- region: Altos Sur
- founded: 1530
- gained the status of a town: 1838
- municipality created: 21 May 1872
- elevated to city stats: 1 September 1970
- Seat: Jalostotitlán

Government
  - Type: Ayuntamiento
  - Municipal president: Judith Macías Lopez

Area
  - Total: 520.9 km^{2} (201.1 sq mi)
  - Town: 5.85 km^{2} (2.26 sq mi)
- Elevation: 1,763 m (5,784 ft)

Population (2020 census)
  - Total: 32,678
  - Density: 62.73/km^{2} (162.5/sq mi)
  - Town: 24,890
  - Town density: 4,250/km^{2} (11,000/sq mi)
  - Religions: Roman Catholic Church
- Demonym: jalostotitlense
- Time zone: UTC-6 (Central Standard Time)
- Postal code: 47120 47121 47122 47123 47124 47125 47126 47127 47128
- Website: official website

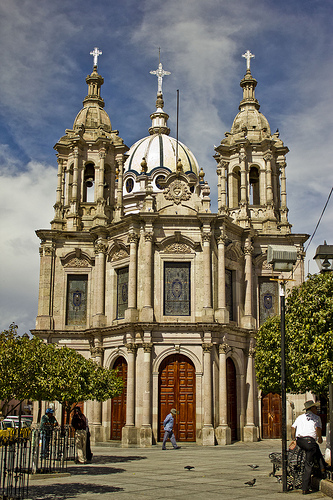

Jalostotitlán (Nahuatl languages: Xālōztōtitlān, lit. 'place of sandy caves', Nahuatl pronunciation: [ʃaːloːstoːˈtitɬaːn̥]) is a town and municipality located in the northeast corner of the state of Jalisco, Mexico, in a region known as Los Altos.

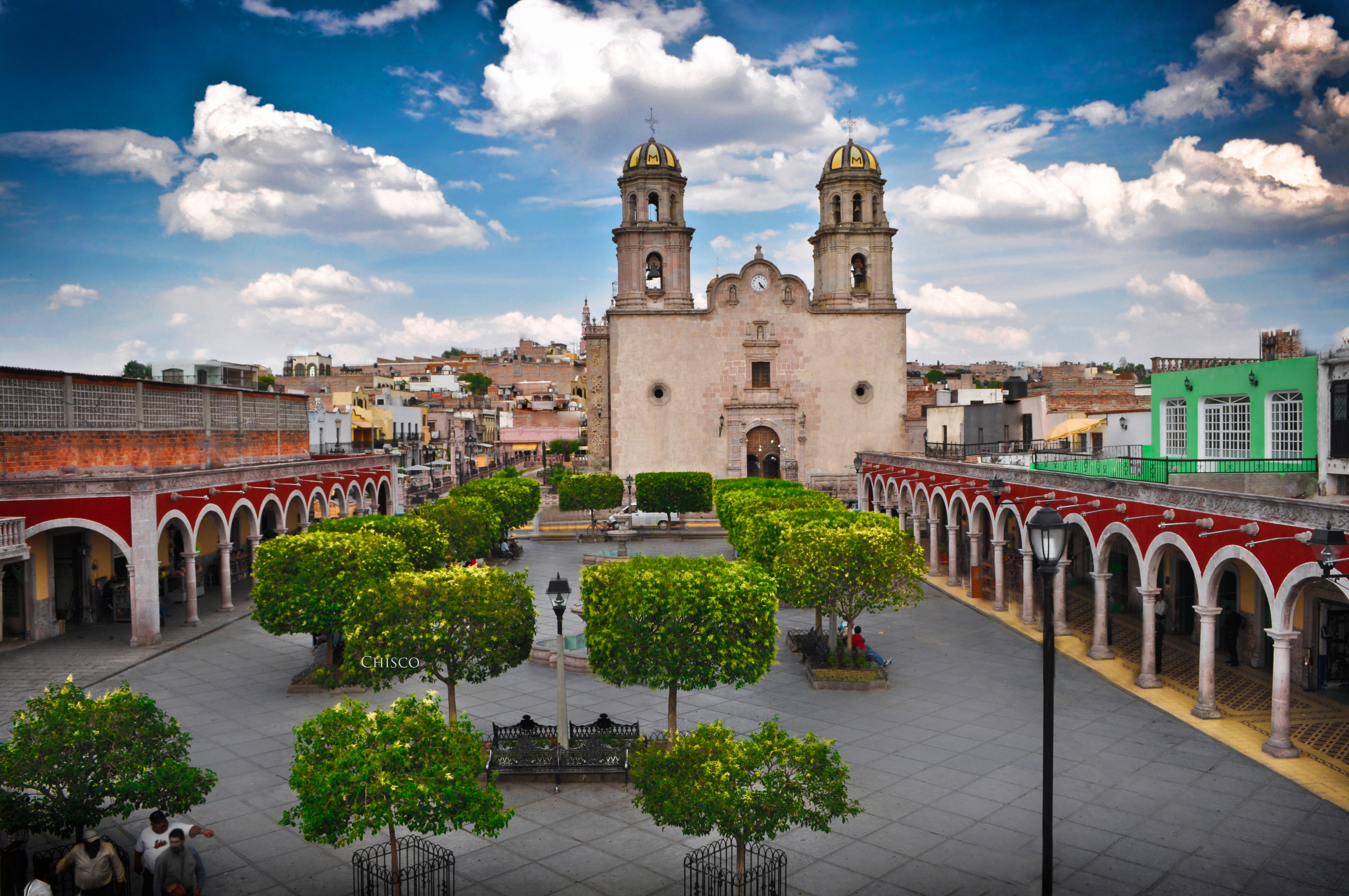
Plaza Alfredo R Plasencia Jáuregui in Jalostotitlán Jalisco

The municipality shares its border on the north with the municipality of Teocaltiche, the east with the municipality of San Juan de los Lagos, to the south with the municipality of San Miguel el Alto, to the southwest with the municipality of Valle de Guadalupe, and to the west with the municipality of Cañadas de Obregón.

The town is located in a midsection of the country, with semi-desert, arid lands to the north and more fertile lands to the south. Winters are relatively cold and summers are hot and rainy. The municipality also includes the towns of San Nicolás de las Flores, Teocaltitán de Guadalupe, San Gaspar de los Reyes and Mitic. In the center of town are the churches that originate from the 16th century, when the town was first founded. Jalostotitlan it's also known for its religious tourism to Santa Ana de Guadalupe, for being the birthplace of the saint Toribio Romo.

== Etymology ==
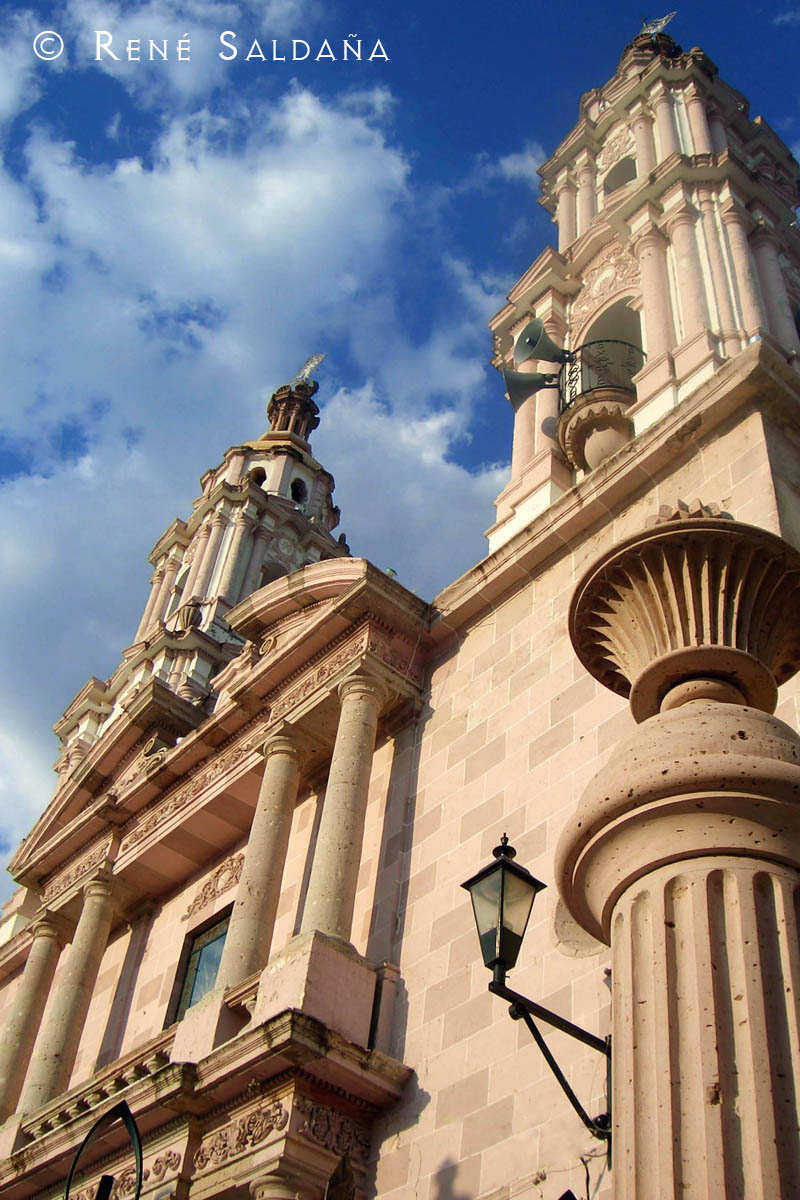

The name "Jalostotitlán" is a Spanish rendering of the Nahuatl toponym Xālōztōtitlān, a locative which can be loosely translated as "place of sandy caves", or more accurately, "in the place of caves of sand" (from xālli "sand" and ōztōtl "cave"), referring to caves with sandy deposits from which sand was extracted.

== History ==
In 1164, the residents of the area (mostly from the Tecuexe and Caxcan tribes) resisted Aztec advances, who had just settled in nearby Teocaltiche for a period of 40 years before moving on to Tenochtitlán.

The Spaniards first arrived in the area during the conquest of Tonalá under Captain Pedro Almíndez Chirino with the 350 Spaniards and 500 Purépecha and Tlaxcaltecs under his control.

After a series of rebellions, the area was placed under the Spanish crown in 1541. The town of Jalostotitlán was founded by Fray Miguel de Bologna in 1544.

After the Mexican War of Independence, Jalostotitlán gained the status of a town in 1838. The municipality of Jalostotitlán was created on 21 May 1872.

Jalostotitlan is the location of sites associated with canonized Mexican Catholic priests Toribio Romo Gonzalez and Pedro Esqueda Ramírez, who were murdered by federal troops during the Cristero War or La Cristiada.

Jalostotitlán was elevated to city status on 1 September 1970 and made the seat of the municipality.

Jalostotitlán is the birthplace of famed General José María González de Hermosillo, who fought in the Mexican War of Independence. The city of Hermosillo, Sonora is named in his honor. It is also the birthplace of famed poet Alfredo R. Plascencia Jáuregui.

== Population ==
The municipality of Jalostotitlán has a population of 32,678 according to the 2000 census, with a population of 24,890 in the municipal seat. Similar to the rest of the Los Altos region, Jalostotitlán did not retain a large indigenous population. Only two-tenths of one percent of inhabitants speak an indigenous language according to the census.

== Economy ==
The main activities in the municipality are agriculture, cattle-farming and the services industry. In the past 15 years Jalostotitlán has become a relevant manufacturing center, producing shoes, leather goods and dairy products. One of the main sources of income for the families of the town, are the "remesas" or remittances of relatives that live abroad (mainly in the United States).

== Culture ==
=== Annual fiestas in Jalostotitlan ===
There are two fiestas that are celebrated in Jalostotitlán once a year. The "Carnaval" that is held early to mid-February and the other in August (August 1–15) is the "Fiestas De La Virgen De La Asuncion" or "La Quincena", a religious festival.

During the Carnaval, there are many activities and events throughout the week. Carnaval has concerts, also known as "palenques". Bullfighting, cockfighting and parades are part of the activities. "Terrazas" or outdoor bars are found in the plaza accompanied with live bandas and mariachi music.

The Fiestas in August include mariachi music, Caxcan native dances, allegoric and big-rig truck parades and at night a "Castillo" or tower with fireworks every night. People from United States (mostly from California and other western states) go there to visit families during these festivals.

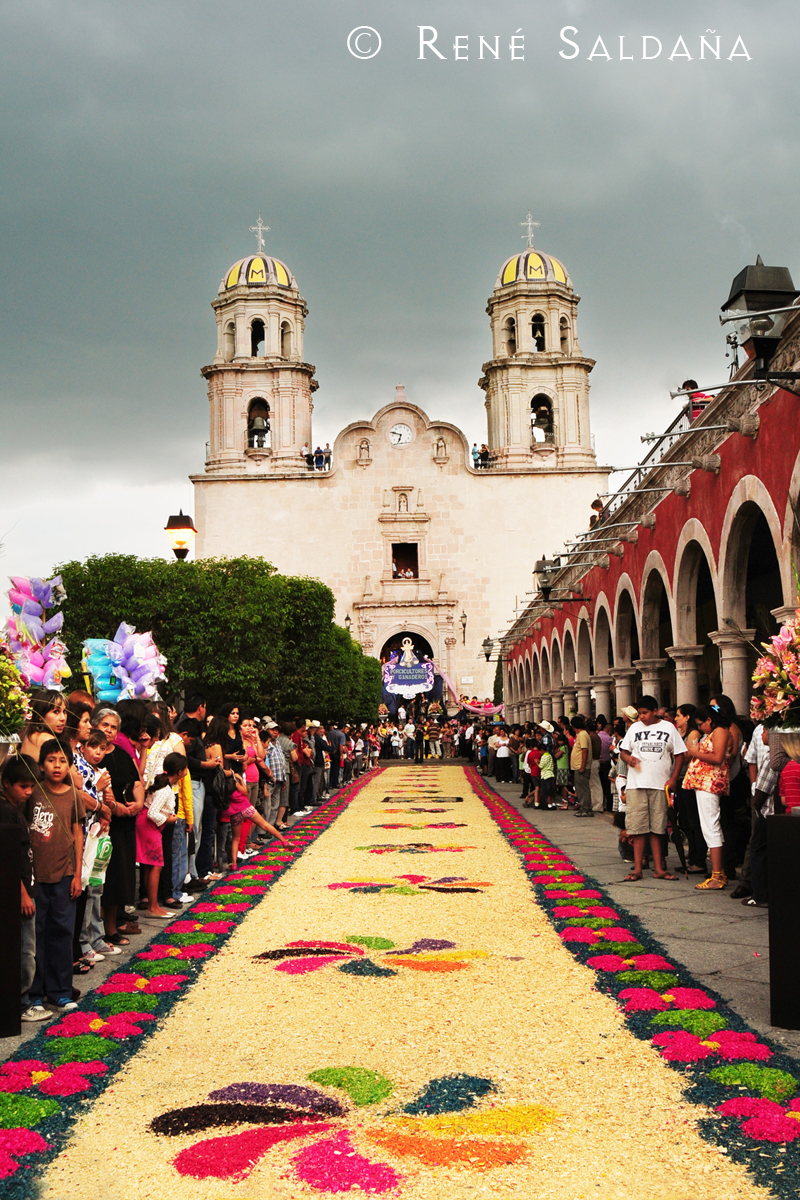

== Sources ==
- "Enciclopedia de los Municipios del Estado de Jalisco" (in Spanish). Archived from the original on 2007-05-15.
- "Insituto Nacional de Estadística, Geografía e Informática" (in Spanish).
