= Jorge Arana Arana =

Mexican politician (born 1960)

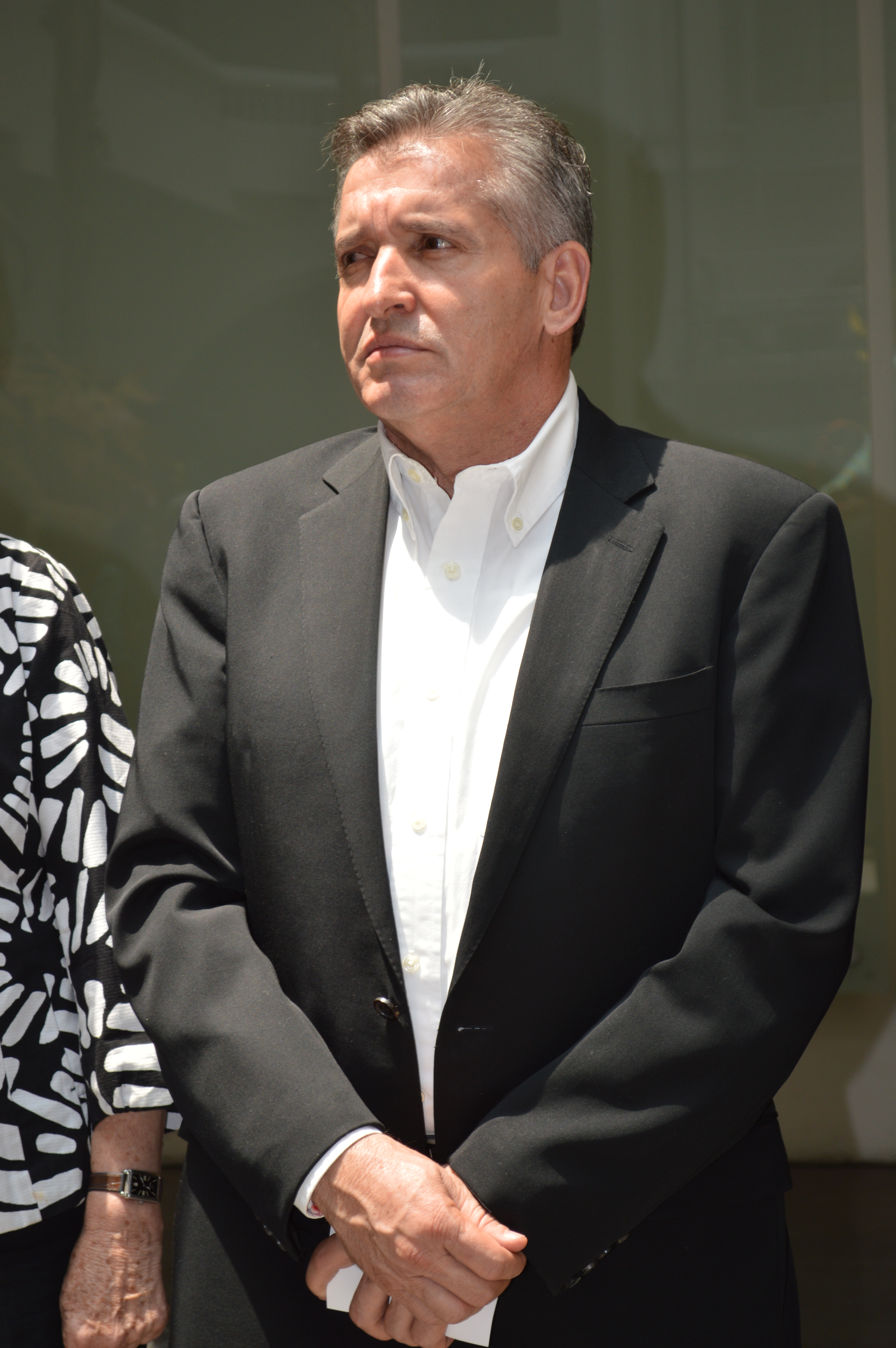
- Born: 15 April 1960 (age 66); Tonalá, Jalisco, Mexico
- Occupation: Politician
- Political party: PRI

Jorge Arana Arana (born 15 April 1960) is a Mexican politician from the Institutional Revolutionary Party (PRI). In the 2009 mid-terms he was elected to the Chamber of Deputies to represent Jalisco's 7th district during the 61st session of Congress.
