= Mitić =

Mitić (Serbian Cyrillic: Митић, pronounced [mǐːtitɕ]) is a Serbian surname. Notable people with the surname include:

- Bogoljub Mitić, Serbian actor
- Ilija Mitić, Serbian American footballer
- Boris Mitić, documentary film director
- Gojko Mitić, Serbian director and actor
- Rajko Mitić, Serbian footballer, one of the five Stars of Red Star Belgrade
