= Fence lizard =

A Fence lizard can be any of several species of spiny lizard (genus Sceloporus), especially:

- The eastern fence lizard or northern fence lizard, Sceloporus undulatus
- The western fence lizard, Sceloporus occidentalis

Note that there are many other species in the Spiny Lizard genus, Sceloporus.
