= San Ignacio Cerro Gordo =

Coordinates: 20°44′N 102°31′W

- Municipality
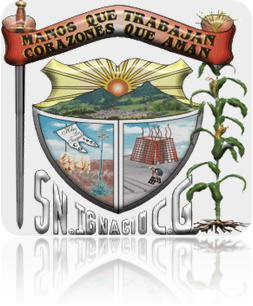
- Coat of arms

- Location in Mexico San Ignacio Cerro Gordo (Mexico)
- Country: Mexico
- State: Jalisco
- Demonym: (in Spanish)
- Time zone: UTC−6 (CST)

San Ignacio Cerro Gordo is a municipality in Jalisco, Mexico. It was established by the Congress of the State of Jalisco, on 1 January 2007 out of Arandas. Decree Number 20371 was published in the Periódico Oficial El Estado de Jalisco, on 30 December 2003, three years before the creation of this municipality, to allow its municipal authorities to be elected by the citizens in the election of municipal presidents on 2 July 2006.

== Government ==
=== Municipal presidents ===
Municipal president	Term	Political party	Notes
Benjamín Orozco Vásquez	01-01-2007–31-12-2009	PAN	
Arturo Orozco Aguilar	01-01-2010–30-09-2012	PAN	
Alberto Orozco Orozco	01-10-2012–30-09-2015	PRI; PVEM	Coalition "Compromise for Jalisco"
José Cleofas Orozco Orozco	01-10-2015–30-09-2018	PRI	
José Cleofas Orozco Orozco	01-10-2018–30-09-2021	PRI	Was reelected on 1 July 2018
Noé Plascencia González	01-10-2021–30-09-2024	PRI	
Teresa Romo González	01-10-2024–	PRI	
