= Acatic =

- Municipality and Town
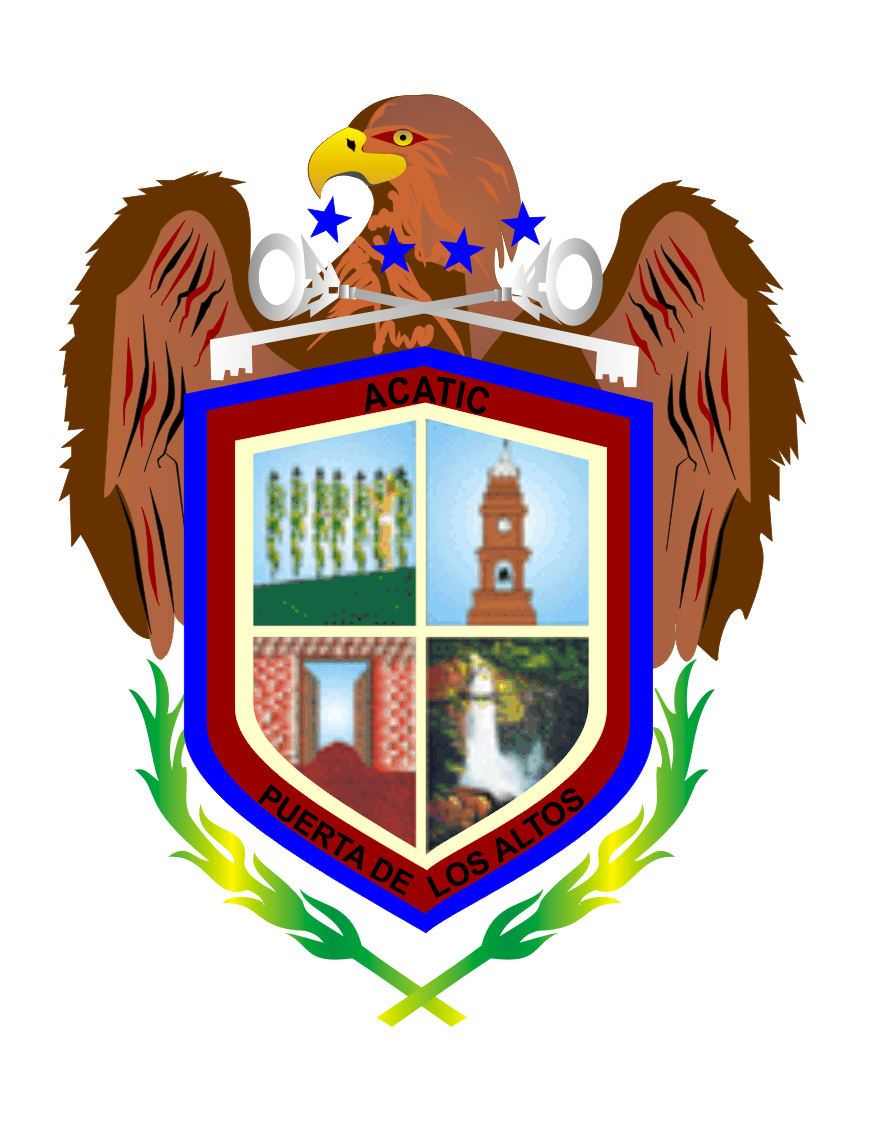
- Coat of arms

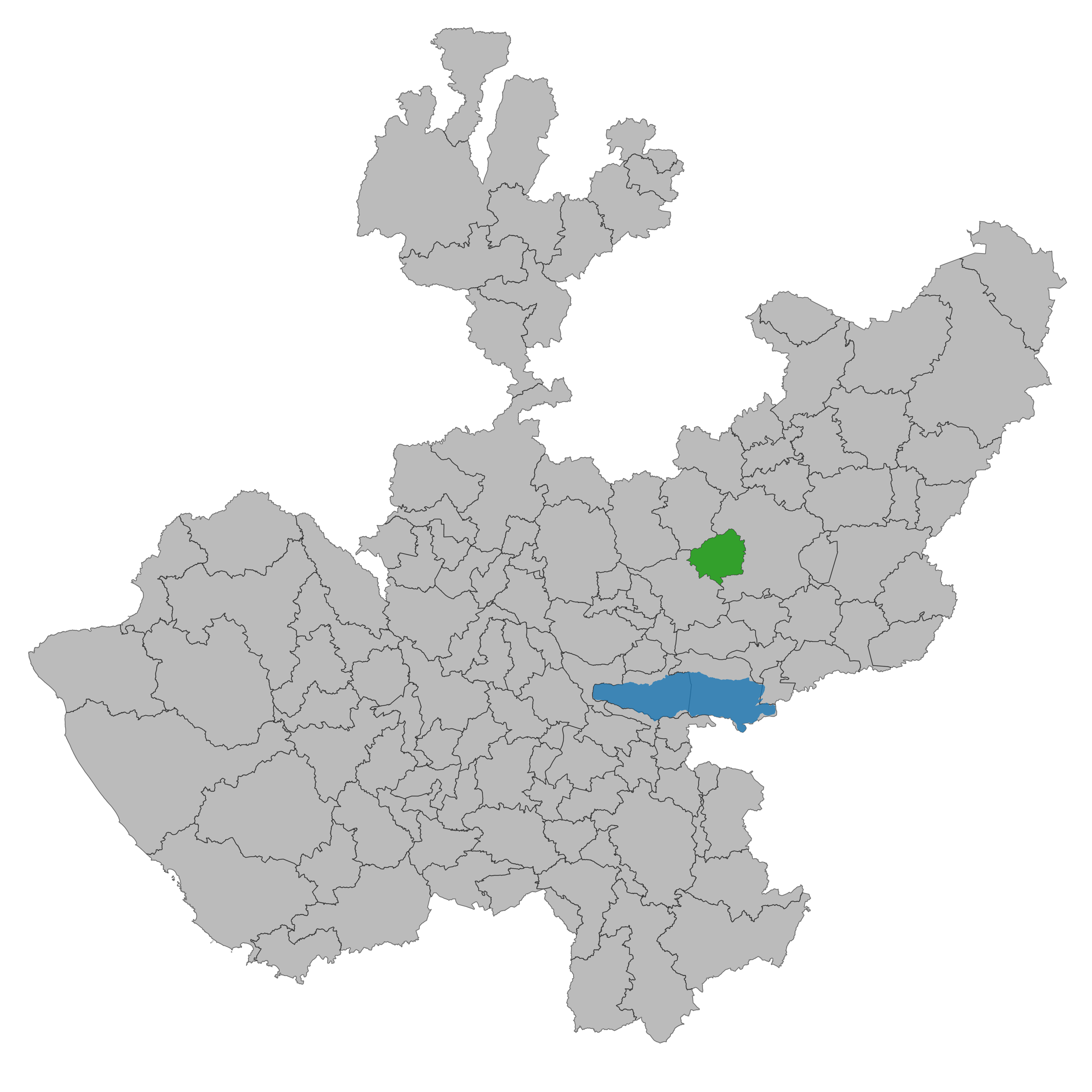
- Location of the municipality in Jalisco

- Location in Mexico
- Coordinates: 20°46′49.11″N 102°54′36.12″W
- Country: Mexico
- State: Jalisco

Area
  - Total: 339.2 km^{2} (131.0 sq mi)
  - Town: 4.32 km^{2} (1.67 sq mi)

Population (2020 census)
  - Total: 23,175
  - Density: 68.32/km^{2} (177.0/sq mi)
  - Town: 13,033
  - Town density: 3,020/km^{2} (7,810/sq mi)
- Time zone: UTC-6 (Central Standard Time)

Acatic is a town and municipality in Jalisco in central-western Mexico. The municipality covers an area of 339.2 km^{2} and as of 2005 had a total population of 18,551.
