= Mexticacán =

- Municipality and town
- Coat of arms

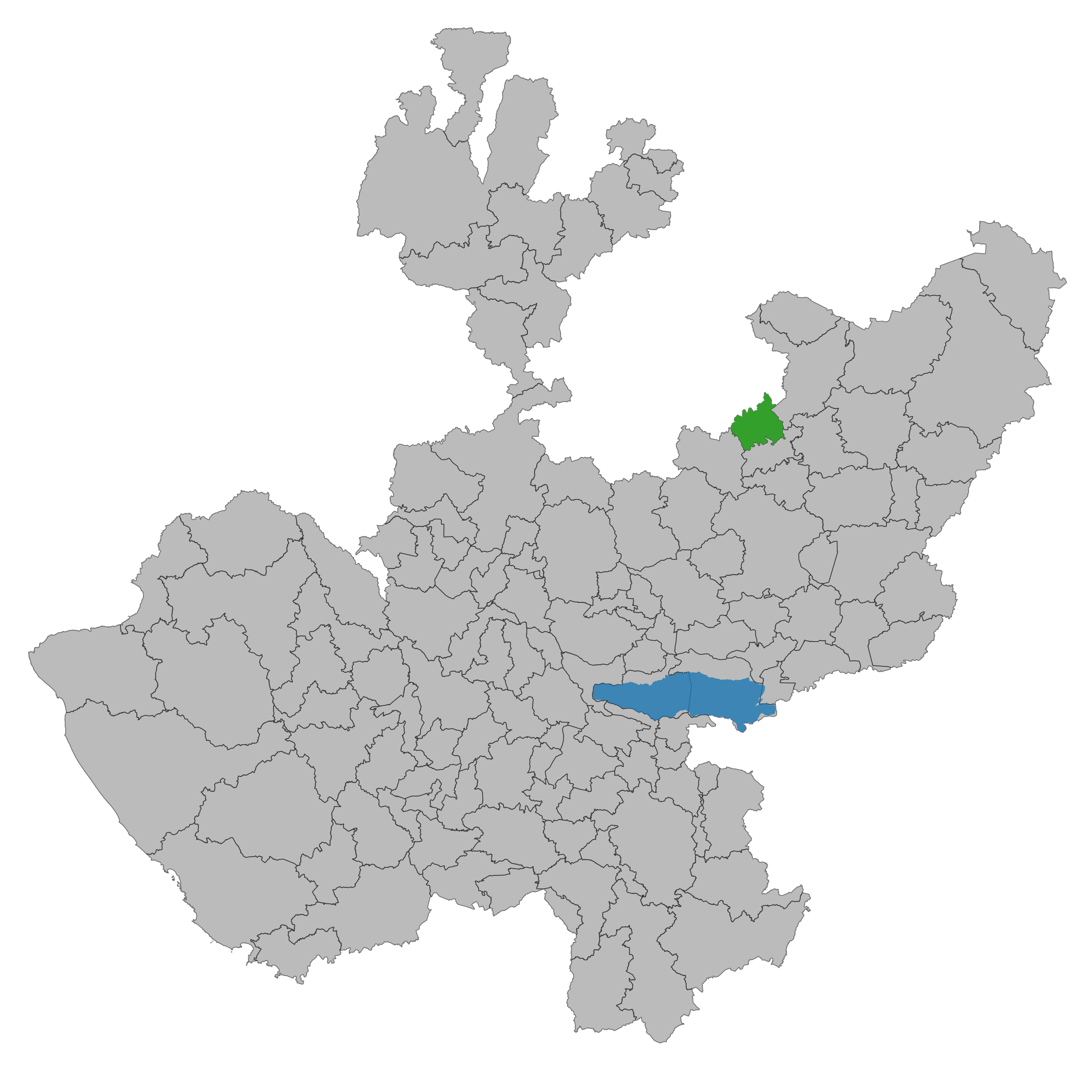
- Location of the municipality in Jalisco

- Location in Mexico
- Coordinates: 21°13′N 102°43′W
- Country: Mexico
- State: Jalisco

Area
  - Total: 287 km^{2} (111 sq mi)
  - Town: 1.83 km^{2} (0.71 sq mi)

Population (2020 census)
  - Total: 5,307
  - Density: 18.5/km^{2} (47.9/sq mi)
  - Town: 3,349
  - Town density: 1,830/km^{2} (4,740/sq mi)
- Time zone: UTC-6 (Central Standard Time)

Mexticacán is a town and municipality in the Southern Zone of Los Altos Region of Jalisco. Mexticacán comes from the Nahuatl language and means "place where the temple for the worship of the moon".

== History ==
=== Early history ===
The first settlers of Mexticacán were Tecuexe, who placed their villages at the foot of the mountains, where there were real strengths to fend off the Chichimecas. Those settlers were known to engaged in the manufacture of earthenware clay during break from work. Due to their late night engagements they became known as "Men who work in the moonlight".

=== 7th century ===
By the early seventh century, was a sweeping immigration throughout the region and particularly in villages Tecuexe; Caxcan, peregrinante home of the Nahuas fought bravely against the bellicose Tecuexe who in the meantime fought against Zacatecas, Guachichiles and others without rest or respite. This war raged for more than a century with an effort to expand the sphere of influence of dominant tribe in Mexticacán. Before the conquest this place was the cacicazgo of Mexticacán.

Nuño de Guzmán expedition through this area trying to bring the Aboriginal Nochistlán Zacatecas, where he was about to perish in an ambush that he tended in the rock of Nochistlán. On Christmas 1531 the city's population was conquered by the Spanish conquistador Cristóbal de Oñate who was sent by Nuno de Guzman.

=== 19th century ===
In 1825 Mexticacán has formed its first council. On January 12, 1836 the city became a Section municipal and by March 13, 1837 it became a part of the Teocaltiche. Subsequently, from 1869 to 1895 the city became the 11th canton of Teocaltiche. On April 19, 1879 the city was awarded the title of village people of Mexticacán.

=== 20th century ===
In the beginning of the 20th century the city got interested into trading with the United States and Europe. The city, back then, was known for its pallet crafts. In 1940, the city had invested into production of ice cream, which was brought to Mexticacán by Genaro Jáuregui, an entrepreneur from the city who also promoted the generation of electric power and radio. By 1950s Mexticacán began entering other cities of the country such as Aguascalientes, Durango, León, Monterrey, Veracruz and many more. In 1970s Mexticacán had fully achieved its internationalization when it opened its hygiene business in Panama.

=== 21st century ===
Recently, Club Mexticacan, was established as a non-profit organization in Northern California to help those in need, such as children and the elderly. In a little less than a year, major accomplishments have been achieved; two vehicles have been purchased to transport the disabled children to special education classes and hundreds of toys, blankets, and shoes have been handed out.

According to the Institute of Transparency and Public Information, Mexticacán became the most opaque city in Jalisco in 2017 because their government had failed to publish fundamental information on their website.

== Government ==
=== Municipal presidents ===
Municipal president	Term	Political party	Notes
Silvia Gómez Medina	01-01-1983–31-12-1985	PRI	
Leonerdo Mercado Ortiz	01-01-1986–31-12-1988	PRI	
Arnulfo Ayón García	01-01-1989–1992	PRI	
Miguel García Santibáñez	1992–1995	PRI	
José Genaro Torres Plascencia	1995–1997	PRI	
René Martín Aguirre Cordero	01-01-1998–31-12-2000	PAN	
Rubén Pérez Lomelí	01-01-2001–31-12-2003	PAN	
Jesús Yáñez González	01-01-2004–31-12-2006	PAN	
Benito Pérez Sandoval	01-01-2007–31-12-2009	PAN	
José Alberto Torres García	01-01-2010–30-09-2012	PRI; Panal	Coalition "Alliance for Jalisco"
Rafael Estrada Jáuregui	01-10-2012–30-09-2015	PAN	
Juan Ramón Lozano Jáuregui	01-10-2015–30-09-2018	PRI	
Nadia Noemí Ortiz Pérez	01-10-2018–30-09-2021	PAN	
Leonardo Gómez Lomelí	01-10-2021–	PRI	
