= Tepatitlán =

Tepatitlán, Jalisco
- City and municipality
- Tepatitlán de Morelos
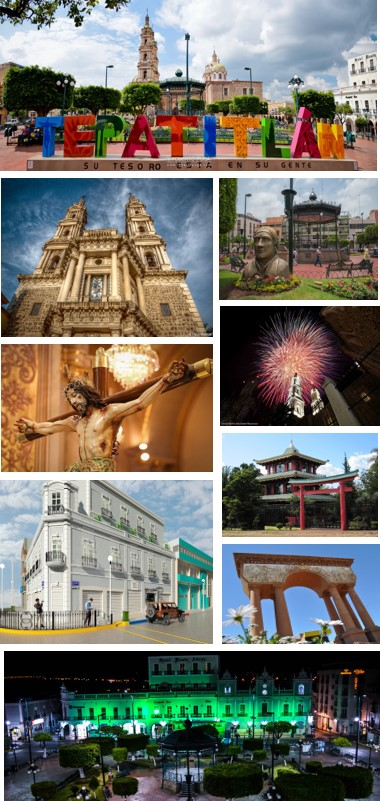
- Collage of Tepatitlán

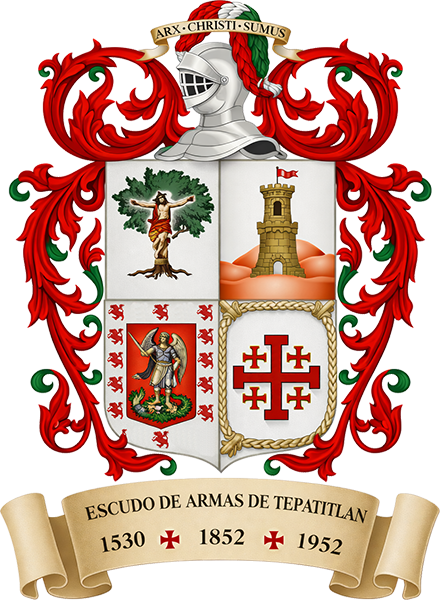
- Coat of arms
- Nicknames: Tepa, La Perla de los Altos
- Motto: Su tesoro está en su gente (Its treasure is in its people)
- Location within Jalisco Location within Mexico
- Coordinates: 20°48′50″N 102°45′50″W
- Country: Mexico
- State: Jalisco
- Foundation: 1530

Government
  - Municipal President (Mayor): Miguel Ángel Esquivias Esquivias; PAN

Area
  - City: 24.72 km^{2} (9.54 sq mi)
  - Municipality: 1,400 km^{2} (540 sq mi)
- Elevation: 1,820 m (5,970 ft)

Population (2023)
  - City: 107,440
  - Density: 4,346/km^{2} (11,260/sq mi)
  - Municipality: 150,190
  - Municipality density: 110/km^{2} (280/sq mi)
- Demonym(s): Alteño, Tepatitlense
- Time zone: UTC-6 (Central Standard Time)
- Postal codes: 47600, 47610, 47603
- HDI: 0.808 – Very High
- Website: tepatitlan.gob.mx

Tepatitlán de Morelos is a city and municipality founded in 1530, in the central Mexican state of Jalisco. It is located in the area known as Los Altos de Jalisco (the 'Highlands of Jalisco'), about 70 km east of state capital Guadalajara. It is part of the macroregion of the Bajío. Its surrounding municipality of the same name had an area of 1,400 km^{2} (500 sq mi). Its most distinctive feature is the Baroque-style parish church in the centre of the city dedicated to Saint Francis of Assisi. Other notable sites include the kiosk that sits on the Plaza de Armas in downtown (ornamented with iron, it was built in France, and brought to the city), the Temple of San Antonio, and the city hall (Palacio Municipal). The latter is one of the most distinctive features in the city, built in neoclassic-baroque style.

The nickname of the city is "Tepa". It is also the largest producer of eggs in Mexico, the largest pork producer in the state, and the primary milk basin in the country, as well as a large producer of tequila. The fleur-de-lys can be seen in a number of public spaces and buildings, including the Santuario de Guadalupe and the Santuario del Señor de la Misericordia, which houses an oak-carved crucifix that, according to the legend, was found by a poor farmer on the Cerro Gordo in 1835; every year from 25 to 30 April, the city hosts the Feria Tepabril which celebrates the Señor de la Misericordia.

== Etymology ==
Tepatitlán means "Hard Stone Place", in the Nahuatl language. But recent artifactual discoveries indicate that the name may actually have a different meaning than the one that is conventionally accepted. The matter has yet to be settled conclusively by scholars and officials.

== Señor de la Misericordia Patronage ==
The image of El Señor de la Misericordia goes around the whole city every year from 28 to 30 April. Many people go to him asking for special needs or healing.

According to popular legend, in 1835, Don Pedro Medina, a poor, old farmer, saw from the outside of his home in the countryside an intense light, coming from the Cerro Gordo. The first few days, he thought it must have been some kind of coal or wood furnace. But he kept seeing the light for a few more days, so he decided he would climb the mountain up to the place to see what was going on. When he finally got to the place where he had seen the light, he found nothing, until he turned his head towards an oak tree, and found in it, an image slightly reminiscent to a crucifix. He was so amazed, he decided it he wanted everyone to see his "Father" as he called it, and so, decided to chop the tree down, and take it into the city. Pedro Medina was a poor man, so to get it from up on the mountain, to his ranch, he had to ask his neighbor for a couple of oxen to bring it down. However, when they cut the image down and attached it to the oxen, it would not move, so Medina told his "compadre" to turn the image face up, and as soon as they did this, the oxen moved with immense ease. In town, the veneration to the holy image grew so big, that Don Pantaleon Leal offered Don Pedro Medina his home as a shrine to the image. And after a few years, in 1831, the Shrine erected in his honor stands, and every year, the city fills with over 2 million visitors to venerate the image and ask God for favors. His feast is celebrated on 30 April, day on which he was brought into his current shrine, and grand festivities are held, for he is the patron of the city.

== Demographics ==
According to the 2020 Census by INEGI, the municipality has a population of 150,190, of which 98,842 live within the city limits of the municipal seat, Tepatitlán, and the rest in the outlying communities and ranches. The city is the state's seventh-largest incorporated community and serves as a significant city outside of the capital, providing the most important university in the region of Los Altos, and an important economic and business center.

Around 81% of the population of the municipality is urban, concentrated mostly in the municipal seat, and other large towns. The annual growth rate is at about 18.9%, placing it among the fastest growing populations in the state.

== Architecture ==
=== Parroquia de San Francisco de Asís ===
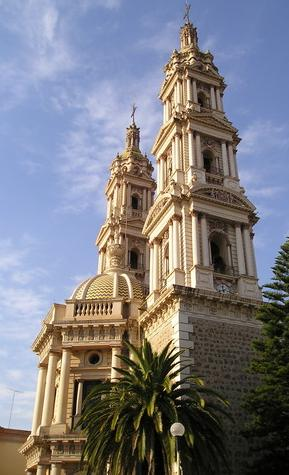
San Francisco de Asís Church with its portico.

The Parroquia de San Francisco de Asís is neoclassic in style, with baroque reminiscence. This temple was built from 1742 to 1775, from piedra braza. It is topped with two slender neoclassical towers, 63m in height each, and three airy domes, all designed by the tepatitlense mason, Don Martín Pozos. The façade is dominated by a curious architectural element: a semi-hexagonal pórtico, which was added as a support for the heavy and slender towers which, as Pozos was told, would collapse if he did not add support. On the inside, it is decorated by the main altar, constructed entirely of white marble from Carrara, and the sculptures of the four Evangelists, sculpted by the Italian architect Augusto C. Volpi, whose depiction of St. John is very detailed. Another example of the local craftsmanship is the sculptural group of La Piedad, carved in oak wood by Agustín Espinoza. Another feature of this church is its clock, located on the south tower, facing the Plaza de Armas, which has been giving the time to the residents 141 years non-stop.

=== Other examples ===
The Santuario del Señor de la Misericordia, the temple of San Antonio, with a great history during the second Cristero War, the building that houses the City Museum, and various constructions of the 19th century, are many other attractive sites in the city which are worth a visit.

=== Presidencia Municipal ===
It was in 1727, that the older "town hall" was expanded with the terrain donated by Mrs. Elena de la Rua, and after it started functioning as city hall, it was completely remodeled from 1905 to 1908 under the direction of Don Francisco de Paula Palomar, who designed it with a near-neoclassic style, mixed with French Baroque in its decor; and in 1954, it was added to the design its current aspect, so jolly, and unique in the western Mexico. Of neoclassic style, the City Hall is a two-story building that holds on the walls of the staircase, a mural of the history of the city, measuring 80m^{2}.

== History ==
The area was primitively inhabited by the Otomi people, a hunter-gatherer society. After that, the Tecuexe arrived in the area, also known as the tecuanni, which means cruel or sanguinary, as a reference to their fighting nature. The city had various locations across time: the first, known as Pueblo Viejo in the Raumalelí hill; afterward, they moved to the Cerrito de la Cruz, which today is home to a hilltop chapel, and finally, under the leadership of Mapelo, to its current location. In the year of 1530, the Spanish captain Pedro Almíndez Chirinos arrived at the area, sent by Nuño Beltrán de Guzmán to explore the region up to the state of Zacatecas, and so he arrived in Zapotlán del Rey, Acatic, Zapotlán el Grande, and Tepatitlán, ending up in the Cerro Gordo. Around the same time Almíndez Chirinos arrived, a group of Franciscan Friars Christened the area, built the first church by the name of San Francisco de Asís, and evangelized the natives. Because of this settlement, the village took the name of San Francisco de Tecpatitlán (The ancient way of spelling the city's name). During the Mexican War of Independence, the village's population, composed and dominated by some Creoles and Mestizos, showed itself to be indecisive about joining the war effort, but after Independence Father Miguel Hidalgo y Costilla entered triumphantly in Guadalajara, the indifference turned into enthusiasm for the cause. One Tepatitlense, Col. Albino Barajas took part as an insurgent in the Battle of Calderón Bridge. By decree of 27 March 1824, Tepatitlán turned into one of the 26 departments into which the state of Jalisco was divided, and was conceded the title of villa. From that same year, it became part of the Third Canton, seated in La Barca, a situation in which it remained until the early 20th Century, when the state's territorial division in cantons disappeared. During the regime of the Second Mexican Empire under Maximilian I of Mexico, according to the provincial statute of 10 April 1862, Tepatitlán, together with most other villages in the Los Altos region, became part of the Department of Aguascalientes. By decree number 41, published 20 September 1883, the town was conceded the title of city, with the denomination Tepatitlán de Morelos in honor of the Revolutionary insurgent José María Morelos y Pavón.

=== Historical Timeline ===
- 1530: Led by Captain Pedro Almíndez Chirinos, a group of Spanish men arrive at the area previously inhabited by Otomí Indians
- 1742: Construction of the San Francisco Parish is begun in the middle of a settlement
- 1811: On 19 April, the peoples of the city endorse Rev. Ramos, who besieged the city of Tepatilán, fighting fiercely for eight consecutive hours against the so-called "Faithful Royalists" after which he took the Plaza de Armas, which was named de Armas (of Arms) after this incident
- 1824: On 27 March, the state grants Tepatitlán the title of "Villa" (town)
- 1835: Don Pedro Medina finds the miraculous image of the Señor de la Misericordia
- 1864: On the first of January, Tepatitlán was invaded by the French troops of Zuavos Argelinos (from North Africa) who were led by General François Achille Bazaine, and destroyed part of the Municipal Archive. Afterward, various groups, led by the French Commanders Munier and Ceynet, fought fiercely against the guerrillas, who led by Rafael "El Chivo" Nuñez, Mauro Vázquez, Lucio Benavides, Félix Pérez, Francisco Cabrera, and other leaders, fought for liberty from the French rule; especially Colonel José Antonio Rojas, who at the head of his 1,000 "Rojeño" riders took in one month four important plazas (quite apart from each other): Zacatecas, Aguascalientes, Ciudad Guzmán and Tepic
- 1883: On 20 September, decree no. 41 was published, whereby the "Villa" of Tepatitlán de Morelos was declared a city by the Governor of Jalisco
- 1927–1929: Tepatitlán was witness and actor in the battles between Cristeros and Federals during the Cristero War; within its urban perimeter, the bloodiest battle of the whole war was fought, and on that sole day, the federal army lost more than 3,000 troops.

== Geography ==
=== Climate ===
Tepatitlán has a humid subtropical climate (Köppen: Cwa) that is close to a tropical savanna climate (Köppen: Aw), with dry, mild winters and warm, wet summers. The land and soils are "skinny", as described by Agustín Yáñez, but have been transformed productively due to decades of efforts by humans. The canyon of the Rio Verde, with its tropical climate at the bottom, about 500 m deep, contains isolated hot springs, visited by animals in colder months.

Climate data for Tepatitlán, Jalisco
Month	Jan	Feb	Mar	Apr	May	Jun	Jul	Aug	Sep	Oct	Nov	Dec	Year
Record high °C (°F)	32.0 (89.6)	32.5 (90.5)	36.5 (97.7)	38.5 (101.3)	39.5 (103.1)	38.0 (100.4)	34.0 (93.2)	32.0 (89.6)	41.0 (105.8)	38.0 (100.4)	32.0 (89.6)	30.5 (86.9)	41.0 (105.8)
Mean daily maximum °C (°F)	24.9 (76.8)	26.3 (79.3)	28.9 (84.0)	31.1 (88.0)	32.2 (90.0)	30.0 (86.0)	26.8 (80.2)	26.9 (80.4)	26.8 (80.2)	27.0 (80.6)	26.7 (80.1)	24.8 (76.6)	27.7 (81.9)
Daily mean °C (°F)	16.3 (61.3)	17.1 (62.8)	19.4 (66.9)	21.8 (71.2)	23.4 (74.1)	23.3 (73.9)	21.6 (70.9)	21.5 (70.7)	21.1 (70.0)	20.1 (68.2)	18.5 (65.3)	16.9 (62.4)	20.1 (68.2)
Mean daily minimum °C (°F)	7.7 (45.9)	8.0 (46.4)	9.9 (49.8)	12.4 (54.3)	14.7 (58.5)	16.7 (62.1)	16.4 (61.5)	16.1 (61.0)	15.5 (59.9)	13.3 (55.9)	10.4 (50.7)	8.9 (48.0)	12.5 (54.5)
Record low °C (°F)	0.0 (32.0)	−6.0 (21.2)	0.5 (32.9)	4.8 (40.6)	7.6 (45.7)	9.0 (48.2)	11.5 (52.7)	11.0 (51.8)	8.0 (46.4)	5.0 (41.0)	3.0 (37.4)	0.0 (32.0)	−6.0 (21.2)
Average precipitation mm (inches)	16.9 (0.67)	6.7 (0.26)	2.7 (0.11)	8.0 (0.31)	33.5 (1.32)	160.7 (6.33)	250.2 (9.85)	208.3 (8.20)	148.0 (5.83)	51.4 (2.02)	15.6 (0.61)	11.9 (0.47)	913.9 (35.98)
Average precipitation days (≥ 0.1 mm)	1.5	1.0	0.3	1.0	2.8	12.7	17.9	16.6	11.2	4.5	1.4	1.4	72.3
Source: Servicio Meteorologico Nacional

=== Fauna and flora ===
Similar to other parts of México, mammals found in the region include species such as the badger, cacomistle, coatimundi, coyote, hare, gray fox, opossum, peccary, rabbit, raccoon, red brocket deer, spotted and striped skunk, squirrels, and white-tailed deer. Elusive, and present in smaller numbers, are the wild felines, the bobcat, jaguar, jaguarundi, ocelot, and puma (mountain lion or cougar). Many birds are common or migrate to the area, including caracara, crows, doves, eagles, egrets, falcons, grouse, guan, hawks, jays, owls, ravens, vultures, wild turkey, as well as numerous hummingbirds, passerine species, pigeons, starlings and songbirds. Many northerly species of birds migrate to the area, annually, during winter. Reptiles and amphibians include both venomous and harmless snakes, lizards such as alligator, beaded, and fence lizards, skinks, hognose snakes, milk snakes, kingsnakes, and rattlesnakes. The common Mexican tree frog (Smilisca baudinii) can be seen and heard on warm nights. Monarch butterflies can be observed in the region during (or upon completion of) their great migration to México from the USA and southern Canada. Tarantulas and several arachnids are endemic to the area.

Among the varied flora are many succulents and trees, such as agave, avocado, conifers, echeveria, and many cactus (especially opuntia) species. Ash trees grow in abundance, as opposed to the once-plentiful oak groves; demand for firewood has depleted their previously vast numbers. Also seen growing are introduced species, including several types of acacia, eucalyptus, pineapple guava, pomegranate, and walnut trees. Herbs and perennials include epazote, hoja santa, Mexican fleabane, tithonia, and wild chives, as well as fennel, licorice (anise), and Cuban oregano (also called Mexican mint). It is a paradise for citrus.

It was announced, in 2009, that the Federal Government would spend around 350 million pesos on the construction of the Centro Nacional de Recursos Genéticos, which is a part of an ecological preserve.

== Government ==
The Government of the municipality of Tepatitlán de Morelos is organized into the H. Ayuntamiento (City Council), which is composed of 17 members from a number of agencies. These include the Presidential Coordination (C. María Elena de Anda), General Secretary, Higher Administrative Office and other departments.

=== Municipal presidents ===
Term	Municipal president	Political party	Notes
1983–1985	Mario Pérez Zermeño	PAN	
1986–1988	Ángel de la Torre González	PAN	
1989–1992	Rigoberto González Martínez	PAN	
1992–1994	Rodolfo Camarena Franco	PRI	
1994–1995	Ricardo Casillas Castellanos	PRI	
1995–1997	Rigoberto González Martínez	PAN	
1998–2000	Ramón González González	PAN	
2000	Demetrio Tejeda Melano	PAN	Acting municipal president
2001–2003	Enrique Navarro de la Mora	PAN	
2004–2006	Leonardo García Camarena	PAN	
2006–2009	Raúl Alcalá Cortés	PAN	
2010–2012	Cecilia González Gómez	PRI; PNA	Coalition "Alliance for Jalisco"
2013–2015	Jorge Eduardo González Arana	PAN	
01/10/2015-30/09/2018	Héctor Hugo Bravo Hernández	MC	
01/10/2018-07/03/2021	María Elena de Anda Gutiérrez	MC	She applied for a temporary leave, to run in the elections of 06/06/2021 in search of reelection
08/03/2021-2021	Míriam González	MC	Acting municipal president
01/10/2021-	Miguel Ángel Esquivias Esquivias	PAN	

== Administrative divisions ==
The municipality of Tepatitlán de Morelos is divided into 7 subdivisions: 6 Delegaciónes (delegations) and a Municipal Seat as follows:

Administrative Divisions
Name	Population	Titular/Delegado (Delegate)
Capilla de Guadalupe Delegation	20,147	
Capilla de Milpillas Delegation	4,908	
Mezcala de los Romero Delegation	3,486	
Pegueros Delegation	3,187	
San José de Gracia Delegation	7,132	
Tecomatlán Delegation	1,466	
City of Tepatitlán de Morelos	104,377	

== Education ==
As well as one of the most important cities in the state, it is one of the most educated, with a literacy rate that exceeds 97%. The city is home to the public university "Centro Universitario de los Altos" (CUAltos), a regional branch of the University of Guadalajara, opened in 1994. The campus offers 15 undergraduate degrees, including business administration, law (LLB), international business, accounting, livestock engineering systems, computer engineering, agribusiness, medicine, nursing, nursing in nutrition, dentistry, psychology and veterinary medicine, as well as a master's degree in animal nutrition.

There is another public university with a focus on technology, "Tecnológico Mario Molina" and private universities like Universidad América Latina, Universidad Nueva Ciencia, Universidad Solidaria de los Altos de Jalisco (USAJ), Universidad de las Culturas and Universidad Interamericana para el Desarrollo.

The city also has 213 basic education schools, 35 secondary schools, and 13 "high schools.

== Notable people ==
In the interior of the City Hall, there is a large mural encircling the staircase, representing the history of Tepatitlán: At the top, Anacleto González Flores, bottom left, Cristero War fighters, and bottom right, the nationally acclaimed beautiful women of the city.

- Edgar Solis – Footballer. Born 5 March of 1987. He made his debut in the First Division of Mexico in 2005 with the Club Deportivo Guadalajara, has also played for the Atlante Fútbol Club and Estudiantes Tecos, currently playing for Club de Fútbol Monterrey of Liga MX.
- Diego Jimenez. Born 7 April of 1986. Soccer player, best known as "Tepa" Jimenez, debuted in 2007 on the computer Atletico Tecomán Mexico. He also played for the Monarcas Morelia and New York Red Bulls. Currently plays for Estudiantes Tecos the Ascenso MX.
- Miguel González, baseball player, born in Pegueros, Municipio de Tepatitlán de Morelos, Jalisco right pitcher, currently with the Baltimore Orioles in the MLB.
- Alan Estrada, actor, dancer and singer.
