= Yahualica de González Gallo =

Yahualica
- Town and municipality
- Yahualica de González Gallo
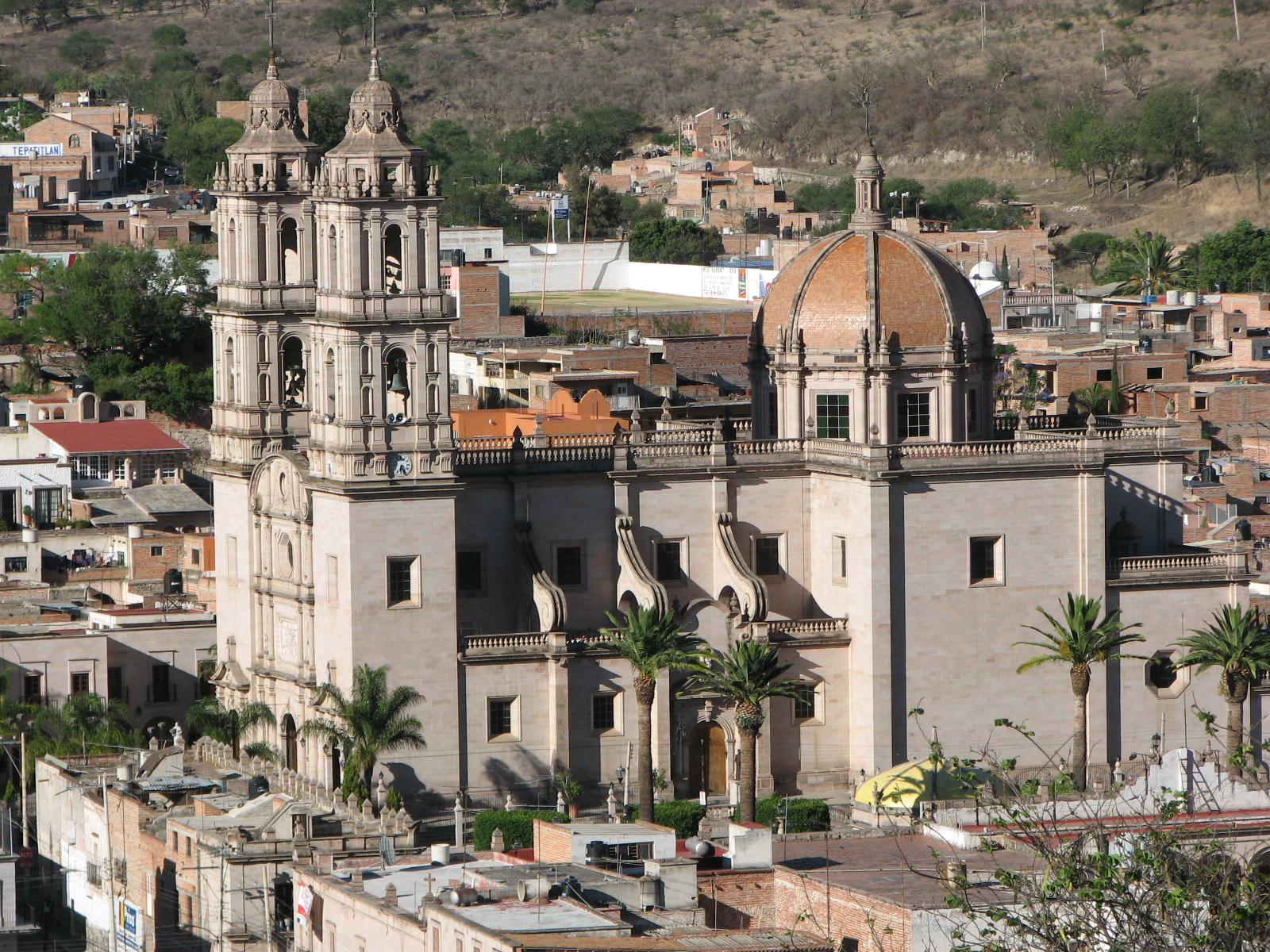

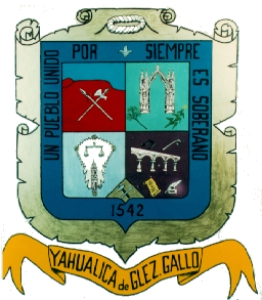
- Coat of arms

- Location in Jalisco Location in Mexico
- Coordinates: 21°10′41.3″N 102°53′9.58″W
- Country: Mexico
- State: Jalisco
- Founded: 1542
- Incorporated: 1824

Government
  - Type: Ayuntamiento
  - municipal president: Danniela Vazquez Gonzalez

Area
  - Total: 563.3 km^{2} (217.5 sq mi)
  - Town: 5.03 km^{2} (1.94 sq mi)
- Elevation: 1,880 m (6,170 ft)

Population (2020 census)
  - Total: 44,220
  - Density: 78.50/km^{2} (203.3/sq mi)
  - Town: 28,330
  - Town density: 5,630/km^{2} (14,600/sq mi)
- Demonym(s): Alteño, Yahualisense
- Time zone: UTC-6 (Central Standard Time)
- Postal code: 47300
- Area code: 344-784
- Website: yahualica.gob.mx

Yahualica is a town and municipality in the northeastern part of Jalisco, Mexico. It is one of the 125 municipalities that make up the state of Jalisco.

Yahualica covers some 563.3 square kilometers and shares borders with the state of Zacatecas.

The name Yahualica is thought to be derived from the indigenous roots of the Nahuas. It may be from "ayahuitl" meaning fog and "calli" meaning house, making Yahualica "the house of fog." Another proposed translation of Ayahuitl is "place surrounded by water" or "the round place".

== History ==
1165: The region's inhabitants were the Tecuexes, who later fought the Aztecs for control of the territory.

1530s: The Spanish, led by Cristóbal de Oñate, conquered the region.

1824: Yahualica was constituted a municipality.

Construction of the main temple in pink quarry, between the years 1850 and 1876.

It became a political and judicial police station in 1896.

It was renamed Yahualica de González Gallo in 1964.

== Transportation ==
Yahualica is served by bus and taxi services, as well as highways leading into and out of Yahualica and throughout the city. The highway transit system includes Fed 71 and Jal 225 (Jal 225) which run entirely in the municipality. Fed 78, southbound, leads to Tepatitlán/Cuquío and northbound to Nochistlán/Aguascalientes. Jal 225 runs east towards the ranchos of Huisquilco, El Durazno, San Isidro, and Pastores.

The closest airports to Yahualica are Francisco Primo de Verdad National Airport (92 mi (148 km) away), Aguascalientes International Airport (51.6 mi (83.0 km) away) and Guadalajara International Airport (53.2 mi (85.6 km) away), each about a two-hour drive.

== Economy ==
The economy of Yahualica is diverse, encompassing agriculture, stockbreeding, industry, commerce, and various services.

=== Stockbreeding ===
The region supports the raising of cattle, horses, and pigs, contributing to local agricultural and economic activity.

=== Gastronomy ===
Yahualica is known for its traditional cuisine, which includes birria, spicy salsa, tostadas, and regional candies.

One of the most distinctive products of the area is chile de árbol, a chili pepper that local producers claim is among the finest in the world due to its unique flavor and spiciness. The high quality of this chili is attributed to the region's soil, climate, and long-standing cultivation techniques. The cultivation of chile de árbol is a crucial economic activity, supporting approximately 300 families in the municipality. Additionally, more than a dozen local industries produce hot sauces, which are widely used in Mexican cuisine.

=== Agriculture ===
Key agricultural products in Yahualica include corn, sorghum, oats, chili, beans, and peaches.

=== Commerce ===
The local economy includes businesses dedicated to the sale of essential goods as well as mixed commercial establishments that offer a variety of products.

=== Industry ===
The primary industrial activities in Yahualica focus on technology and manufacturing.

=== Services ===
The region offers a range of services, including professional, financial, administrative, technical, social, tourism-related, personal, and maintenance services.

=== Forestry ===
Oak plantations contribute to the local forestry sector.

=== Mining ===
The area contains deposits of manganese, which represent a potential resource for economic development.

=== Fishing ===
Local fisheries harvest carp and tilapia from regional water sources.

== Cultural and tourist attractions ==
Architecture

- Main square plaza
- Toledo hotel
- Benito Juárez theater
- Parroquia de San Miguel Arcángel Catholic church (pictured at top right)

== Sports ==
Yahualica has a soccer/futbol team in the Third Division of Mexico, Club Deportivo De Los Altos and C.D. Salamanca.

El Club Deportivo Gallos is the soccer team that represents the municipality in Third Division of Mexico, local and state tournaments.

== Notable people ==
- José de Jesús González Gallo, politician
- Juan Sandoval Íñiguez, Roman Catholic cardinal
- Antonio Martínez, footballer
- Martín Vásquez, footballer

== Yahualica in fiction ==
Yahualica is the setting for the novel Al filo del agua, written by Agustín Yáñez.

== Government ==
=== Municipal presidents ===
Municipal president	Term	Political party	Notes
Fortino Toledo	1900		
Juan E. Ruvalcaba	1900–1901		
Irineo Limón	1901		
Juan E. Ruvalcaba	1901		
Leandro Gómez	1902		
A. López Gallo	1902		
Leandro Gómez	1902		
Fortino Toledo	1903		
Juan E. Ruvalcaba	1903		
Leopoldo Rodríguez	1903		
Juan E. Ruvalcaba	1903		
Fortino Toledo	1903		
A. López Gallo	1904		
Juan E. Ruvalcaba	1904		
A. López Gallo	1904		
Juan E. Ruvalcaba	1904		
A. López Gallo	1904		
Juan E. Ruvalcaba	1905		
A. López Gallo	1905		
Víctor Toledo	1905		
A. López Gallo	1905		
José Ma. Ruvalcaba	1906		
Félix R. González	1906		
Juan Casillas	1906		
Nicolás García	1907		
J. Cleotilde Quezada	1907		
Nicolás García	1907		
Leopoldo Rodríguez	1908		
Lázaro García	1908		
Leopoldo Rodríguez	1908		
Nicolás García	1909		
R. Agredano	1909		
Nicolás García	1909		
R. Agredano	1910		
Leopoldo Rodríguez	1910–1911		
Lázaro García	1911		
Julián Limón	1911		
Leopoldo Rodríguez	1911		
Margarito Pérez	1912		
Jesús Varela	1912		
Margarito Pérez	1912		
Jesús Varela	1912		
Víctor Ruvalcaba	1913		
J. Jesús Villegas	1914		
Víctor Ruvalcaba	1914		
Nicolás García	1914–1915		
Fortino Toledo	1915–1916		
Pedro Gómez Rodríguez	1916		
Cesáreo Gómez	1916		
Irineo Limón	1917		
Eulalio López	1917		
Fortino Toledo	1917		
Irineo Limón	1917		
Eulalio López	1917		
J. Jesús Villegas	1918		
Blas Ruvalcaba	1918		
J. Jesús Villegas	1918		
Blas Ruvalcaba	1918		
J. Jesús Villegas	1918		
Víctor Ruvalcaba	1918		
Irineo Limón	1918		
Víctor Ruvalcaba	1918		
Blas Ruvalcaba	1919		
Víctor Ruvalcaba	1919		
Blas Ruvalcaba	1919		
J. Jesús Villegas	1919		
Víctor Ruvalcaba	1919		
J. Jesús Villegas	1919		
Víctor Ruvalcaba	1919		
J. Jesús Villegas	1919–1920		
Víctor Ruvalcaba	1920		
Felipe Toledo	1920		
Leopoldo Rodríguez	1920		
Felipe Toledo	1920		
Leopoldo Rodríguez	1920		
Felipe Toledo	1920		
Severiano Ruvalcaba	1920–1921		
J. Jesús Limón	1921		
Víctor Ruvalcaba	1921		
J. Jesús Limón	1921		
Víctor Ruvalcaba	1921		
Víctor Toledo	1922		
Blas Ruvalcaba	1922		
Víctor Toledo	1923		
Margarito Pérez	1924		
Leopoldo Rodríguez	1924		
Margarito Pérez	1924		
Blas Ruvalcaba	1924		
Gregorio Macías	1924		
Blas Ruvalcaba	1924–1926		
Manuel Ruvalcaba	1927		
Nicolás García	1927		
Felipe González Gallo	1927		
Cesáreo Gómez	1927–1928		
Felipe González Gallo	1928–1929		
Gregorio González Gallo	1929	PNR	
Felipe González Gallo	1930–1931	PNR	
Gregorio González Gallo	1932–1933	PNR	
Tomás Limón González	1934	PNR	
Canuto González Limón	1935	PNR	
J. Inés González Gallo	1936–1937	PNR	
Heliodoro Álvarez G.	1938	PRM	
Víctor Limón R.	1939	PRM	
Heliodoro Álvarez G.	1939	PRM	
J. Inés González Gallo	1940	PRM	
Tomás Limón González	1941–1942	PRM	
J. Inés González Gallo	1943–1944	PRM	
Heliodoro Álvarez G.	1945	PRM	
Daniel Macías González	1946	PRI	
Rubén Toledo González	1947	PRI	
Elías Gómez Rodríguez	1947–1948	PRI	
Miguel A. Limón R.	1949	PRI	
J. Jesús García R.	1949–1951	PRI	
Francisco Martínez Rueda	1951	PRI	
C. Juan G. Macías	1951–1952	PRI	
Ignacio Macías T.	1953–1954	PRI	
Emilio Ruvalcaba R.	1955	PRI	
J. Jesús Toledo V.	1956	PRI	
Porfirio Mercado S.	1957–1958	PRI	
Emilio Ruvalcaba R.	1959–1961	PRI	
Rafael Toledo M.	1962–1964	PRI	
Celedonio Mejía R.	1965–1967	PRI	
José Molina Martínez	01-01-1968–31-12-1970	PRI	
Miguel A. Limón R.	01-01-1971–31-12-1973	PRI	
Adalberto González J.	1974	PRI	
José Vallejo Chávez	1974–31-12-1976	PRI	
Ignacio Álvarez R.	01-01-1977–31-12–1979	PRI	
Miguel Ángel García	01-01-1980–31-12-1982	PRI	
Daniel Macías V.	01-01-1983–31-12-1985	PRI	
Rubén Mejía Campa	01-01-1986–1987	PRI	
J. Guadalupe Lomelí González	1987–31-12-1988	PRI	
Daniel Macías Velasco	1989–1992	PRI	
Gregorio M. González Limón	1992–1995	PRI	
Juan Alfredo Rangel López	1995–1997	PAN	
Faustino Plascencia Plascencia	01-01-1998–31-12-2000	PAN	
Sergio Octavio Castañeda Gutiérrez	01-01-2001–31-12-2003	PAN	
José Guadalupe Durán Jáuregui	01-01-2004–31-12-2006	PRI	
Elías Octavio Íñiguez Mejía	01-01-2007–31-12-2009	PAN	
Anastacio Mercado Martínez	01-01-2010–30-09-2012	PAN	
José Luis Íñiguez Gámez	01-10-2012–30-09-2015	PAN	
Alejandro Macías Velasco	01-10-2015–30-09-2018	PRI; PVEM	
Alejandro Macías Velasco	01-10-2018–30-09-2021	PRI	He was reelected on 1 July 2018
Danniela Julemmy Vázquez González	01-10-2021–	MC	
