= Valle de Guadalupe, Jalisco =

Village in Jalisco, Mexico

Valle de Guadalupe
- Municipality
- Location in Jalisco Valle de Guadalupe (Mexico)
- Country: Mexico
- State: Jalisco
- Demonym: (in Spanish)
- Time zone: UTC−6 (CST)

Valle de Guadalupe is a municipality in the state of Jalisco, Mexico, in the Altos Sur Region. Its capital is the town of Valle de Guadalupe. It is part of the macroregion of Bajío Occidente or Central West of Mexico.

== History ==
The first people who inhabited the region were the Chichimeca nations, the name given by the Mexicas to a group of native peoples who inhabited the center and north of the country.

The losses suffered by the Spanish conquistadors in the region due to the Chichimecas attacks led them to respond with a war tactic of ethnocide. They brought to the Altos de Jalisco rural Castilian militiamen, some of them of French descent, led in the High Middle Ages to repopulate central Spain. However, there were also Portuguese, Italians and natives of Flanders, who had previously fought against Turks and Moors. These peasant soldiers established themselves with patterns of private property and with a Catholic ideology, mixing with some Chichimecas who had remained.

== Geographic description ==
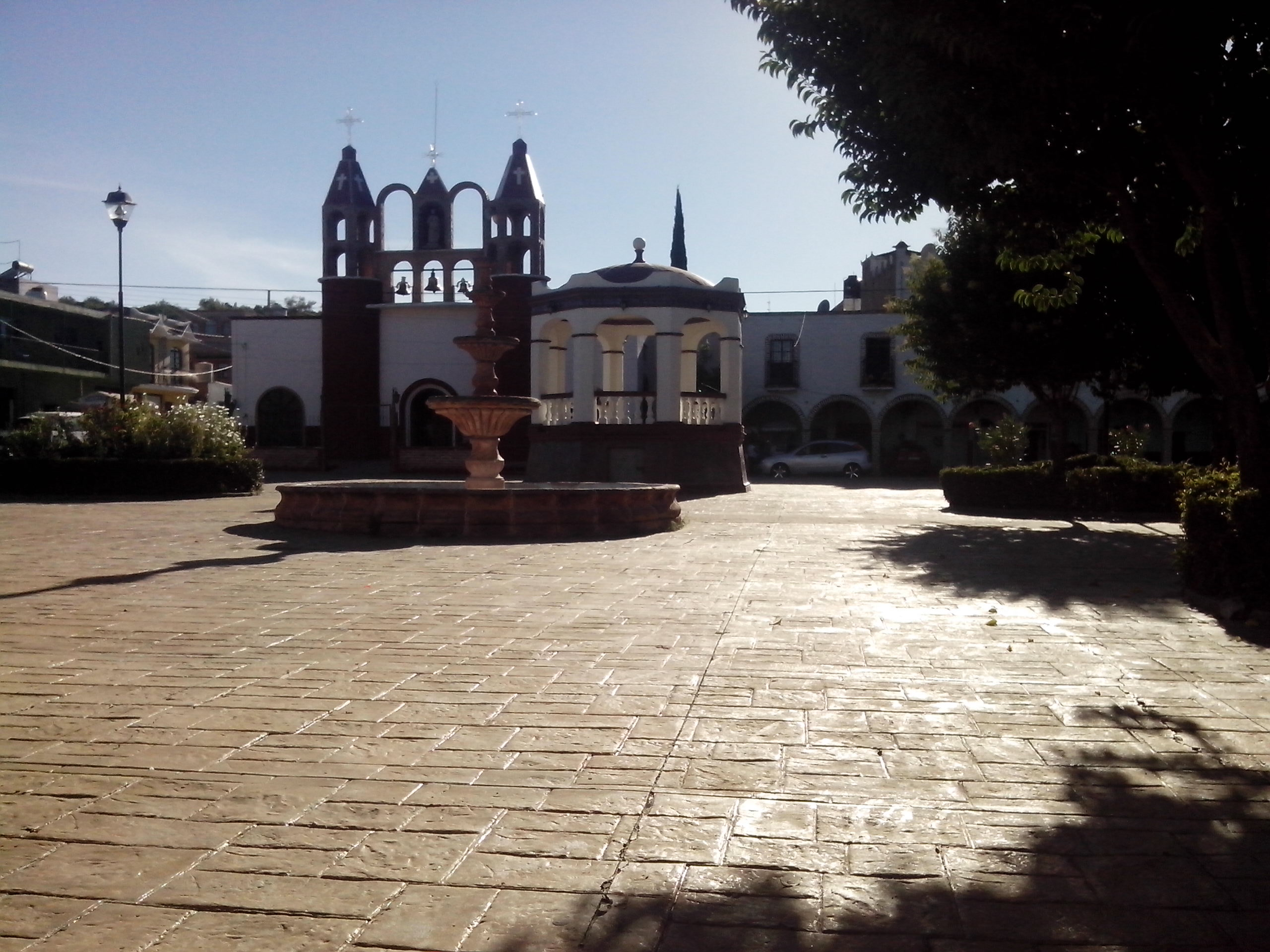
Plaza de El Guajolote

=== Location ===
Valle de Guadalupe is located in the northwestern part of Jalisco, between 20° 57’ 45” and 21° 07’ 35” north latitude and 102° 34’ 00” and 102° 50’ 00” west longitude, with elevations ranging from 1,800 to 2,000 meters above sea level.

The municipality borders the municipalities of Cañadas de Obregón and Jalostotitlán to the north; San Miguel el Alto to the east; San Miguel el Alto and Tepatitlán de Morelos to the south; and the municipalities of San Miguel el Alto and Tepatitlán de Morelos] to the west. Tepatitlán de Morelos, Yahualica de González Gallo, and Cañadas de Obregón.

Topography: The municipality's surface consists generally of semi-flat areas (77%), flat areas (20%) with elevations between 1,750 and 1,850 meters above sea level, and rugged areas (3%).

Soils: The territory consists of lands dating from the Quaternary period. The predominant soil types are Mollic Planasol, Pellic Vertisol, and Haplic Phaeozem. The municipality has a land area of 51,612 hectares, of which 7,064 are used for agriculture, 39,994 for livestock, 800 for forestry, and 110 for other uses. The land is urban, and 3,644 hectares have other uses. Regarding property ownership, 50,972 hectares are privately owned, and another 640 hectares are ejido land; there is no communal land ownership.

=== Hydrography ===
Its hydrological resources are provided by the rivers and streams that make up the Verde-Grande de Belén river sub-basin, belonging to the Lerma-Chapala-Santiago hydrological region. Its rivers are: Verde, El Valle, and El Salto; the streams are: Agua Caliente, El Comal, Los Gatos, Arroyo Prieto, and La Colina. The following dams are also located: El Salto, El Pantano, La Rana, and Ramírez.

=== Climate ===
The climate is semi-arid, with dry autumns, winters, and springs, and temperate. The average annual temperature is 18.3°C, with a maximum of 27.6°C and a minimum of The average temperature is 9.0°C. The rainy season occurs between June and August, with an average precipitation of 814.3 mm. The average number of days with frost per year is 16.2. The prevailing winds are from the southwest.

=== Flora and fauna ===
Its vegetation is varied and extensive. The most abundant tree species are white oak, mesquite, huizache chino (Vachellia farnesiana), palo dulce, copalillo, and Ipomoea arborescens (morning glory).

The area is also known as cazahuate, and to a lesser extent, the American ash (Fraxinus americana). Two of the areas with the highest density of white oak are Cerro de la Llave and Cerro de Ramblas. As for the fauna, in addition to the hare, rabbit, and coyote, a wide variety of birds also inhabit the area, including the mockingbird, sparrow, and thrush, among others. Reptiles, rodents, and other animals are also present. As of 2020, a local group of biologists and enthusiasts was working on a taxonomic inventory of the municipality, which has not yet published its results.

== Demographics ==
=== Localities ===
In the 2020 INEGI census, the municipality of Valle de Guadalupe had 71 localities.

INEGI Code	Locality	Population (2020)
141110001	Valle de Guadalupe	4628
Other localities		1,999
Total municipal		6,627
