= Emplume =

Street theater duo

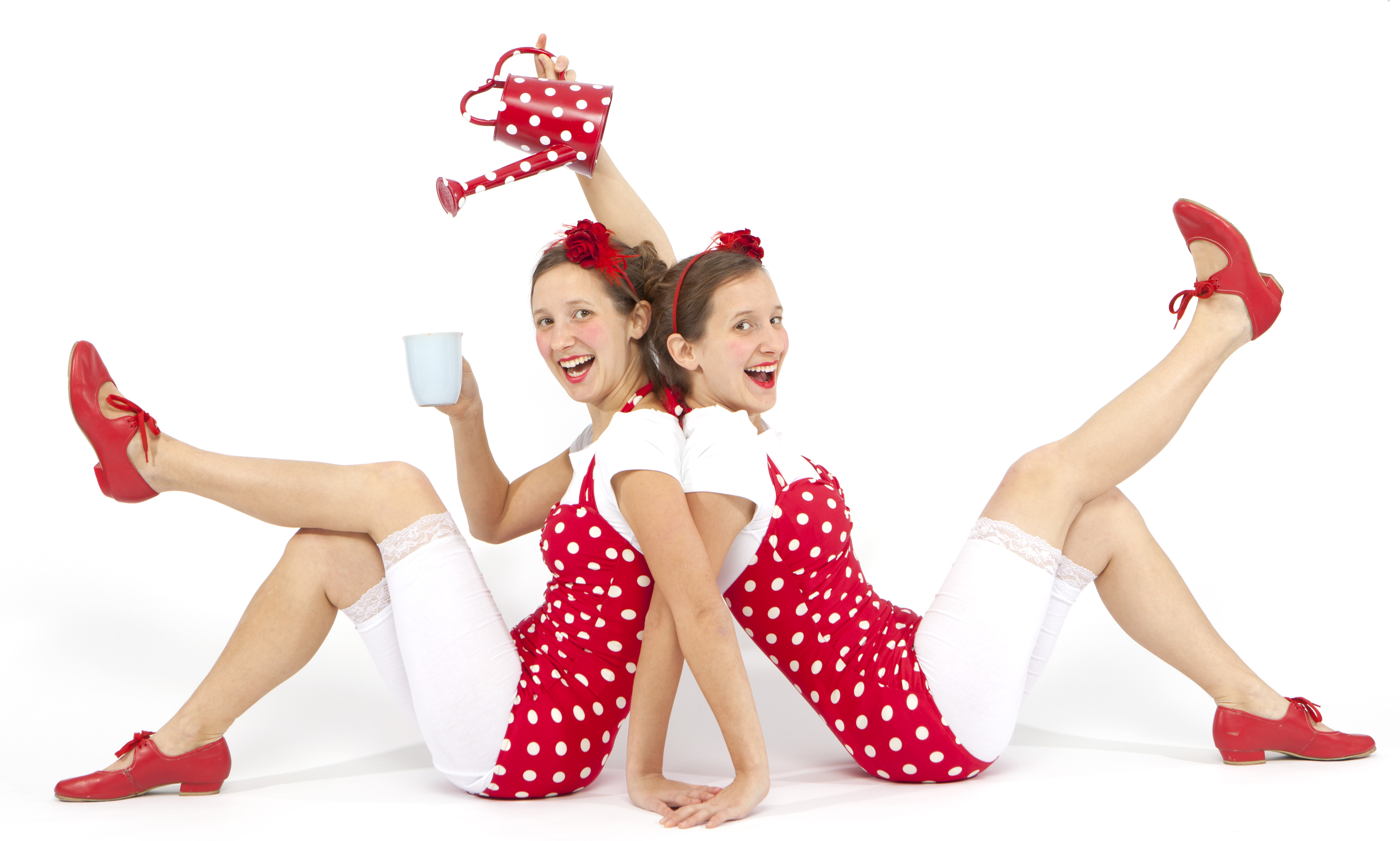
Promotional photo of Emplume

Emplume is a street theater duet made up of two twin sisters. Their work has been classified as "urban animation." The duet has performed in their native Quebec and various venues around the world.

== History ==
The circus and theater company Emplume was founded by Josette and Francoise Lepine in 2007, who produce and interpret all the acts.

Françoise is a multidisciplinary artist who had her debut in street theater during her adolescence. She obtained her diploma at the Rimouski Music Conservatory, in Quebec City Circus School and Clown Francine Coté School. In 2009 she obtained a master's degree in theoretical physics.

Josette debuted as pianist at the Rimouski Music Conservatory at age 19. Since then she has become professional accordionist, and she debuted on street drama in 2001. She has also studied dance, physical and circus theater, particularly at the Quebec City Circus School.

Danielle Berbau and Sylvain Leblanc also participate on the show as set design assistants. Celine Coté is the choreography assistant and Jérémie Guilbault Asselin in charge of lightning.

Emplume currently performs in Quebec City, where they continue to train with the Quebec City Circus School.

== Artistry ==
Emplume's performances can have a flexible duration from 5 to 45 minutes depending on the demand. They perform for audiences of all ages, and performances can be in theatres or outdoors. This show has been presented in French, English, Spanish or mute. It has been presented in six countries and was a finalist at the Kingston Busker Rendez-Vous.

The spectacle of juggling tricks offered by Josette and Francoise consists of different acts, such as "The dance of the balls" where the twins are introduced completely inside giant balloons. Juggling with umbrellas is another act, as well as "The appearance of fruit", in which bananas and other items suddenly appear. Through their performances they try to fire up the emotions of the audience.

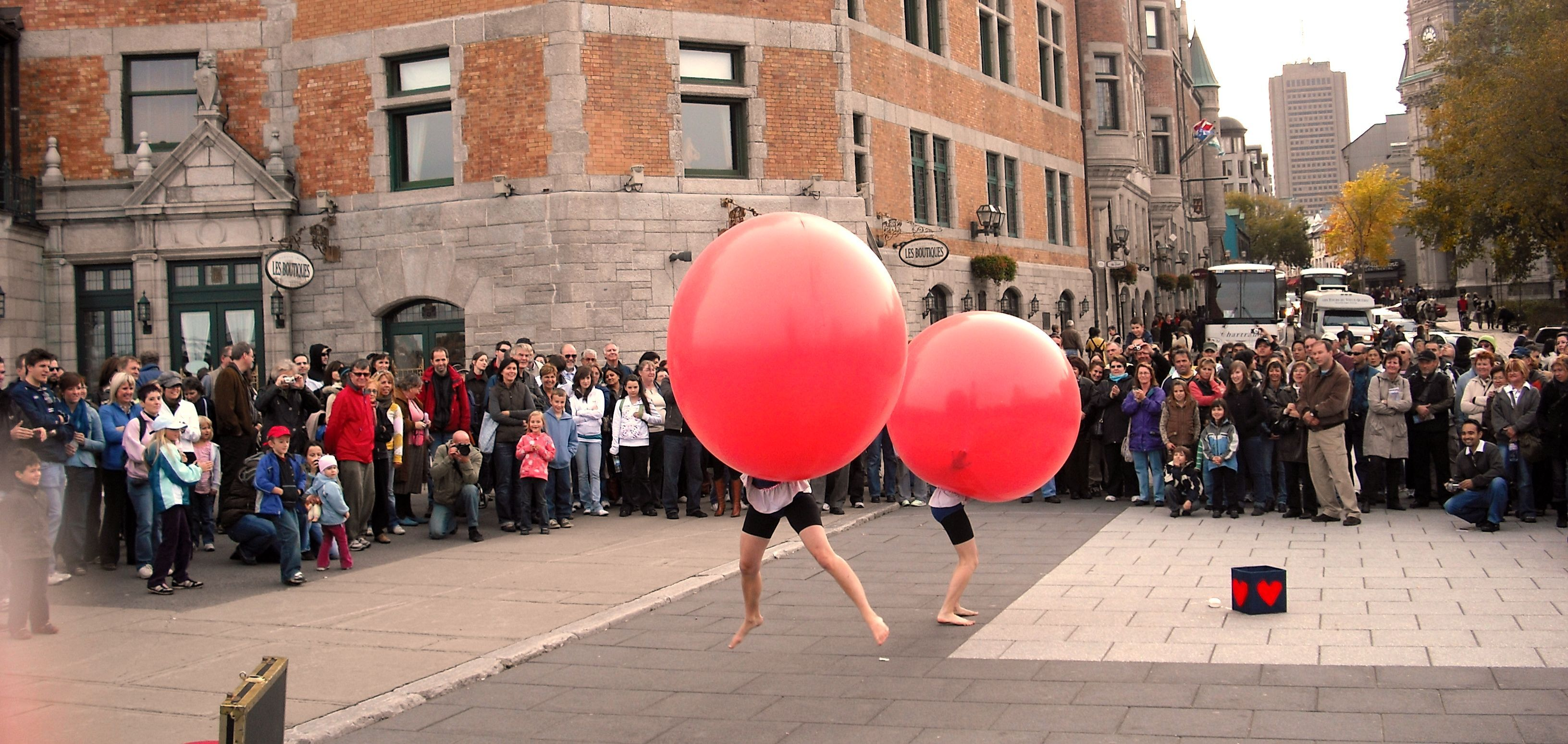
Emplume performing

== Presentations ==
The group has performed in Quebec as part of Cirque du Soleil, and at international festivals in Japan, Argentina and Mexico, in festivals such as Festival de la Cultura Infantil, Sinaloa, Mexico (2010), Festival Cultural de Marzo, Lagos de Moreno, Mexico (2010), Noge Street Performers Festival, Yokohama (2009), Clown Festival Payasadas, Rosario, Argentina (2008), Circus Festival Hazmereír, Mar del Plata, Argentina 2008, Kingston Buskers Rendez-vous, Festival finale, Kingston, Ontario (2008), World street performers festival of Trois-Rivières, Trois-Rivières (2007 and 2009), Éveil du Géant, Cirque du Soleil 25th anniversary, Baie-Saint-Paul, Quebec (2009), Festi-arts, Domaine Maizeret, Québec (2009–2010), Festivities of Nouvelle France, Québec (2009-2010 ), Circus Festival Hazmereír, Mar del Plata Argentina (2008), Kingston Buskers Rendez-vous, Festival finale, Kingston (2008), World street performers festival of Trois-Rivières, Trois-Rivières (2007 and 2009),Éveil du Géant, Cirque du Soleil origin's 25th anniversary, Baie St-Paul (2009), Festi-arts, Domaine Maizeret, Québec (2009–2010), Festivities of Nouvelle France, Québec (2009–2010). They have also performed at cabarets and other shows, such as Gala « One Drop » pour le Cirque du Soleil (2009), Multi-disciplinary show "Passion Incandescente", Espace 400e, Québec (2009 and 2010), Gala of 1st Circus and Street arts Convention, Chibuayante Chile (2009), Circus Show "Kusi Colca", Chivay Péru (2009), Variety International at Casa Circobufo, Santiago Chile (2009), Circus show "Veladas intimas", Buenos Aires Argentina (2008), Opening Cabaret of 12th Argentina Circus Convention, Montegrande Argentina (2008), Québec national day festivities, Neuchâtel 2008, Vanier (2010), Festival Saint-Odilon, Saint-Odilon (2008), Emplume at Suzanne-Guité Space, Percé (2007–08), Québec's Carnaval parade, Québec (2007 and 2010), Festival du Bec du Lièvre, Québec (2010), Red Cross's Cabarethon for Haiti, Québec (2010), Bonaventure's 250th anniversary, Bonaventure 2010), Family festival, La Malbaie 2010, Canada day, Québec 2010
