= Ramon Gutierrez =

Ramon Gutierrez may refer to:

- Ramón A. Gutiérrez, American historian
- Ramon Rodrigo Gutierrez, Filipino politician

== See also ==
- Ramón Muñoz Gutiérrez, Mexican politician
