= Francisco Primo de Verdad National Airport =

Airfield in Lagos de Moreno, Jalisco, Mexico

Lagos de Moreno National Airport Aeropuerto Nacional de Lagos de Moreno
- IATA: LOM; ICAO: MMOO; LID: LMO

Summary
- Airport type: Public
- Serves: Lagos de Moreno, Jalisco, Mexico
- Time zone: CST (UTC-06:00)
- Elevation AMSL: 1,880 m / 6,168 ft
- Coordinates: 21°15′33″N 101°56′37″W

Map
- Location of the airport in Jalisco LOM (Mexico)

Runways
Direction	Length		Surface
Direction	m	ft	Surface
04/22	1,200	3,937	Asphalt

Statistics (2021)
- Total passengers: N/A
- Source: Agencia Federal de Aviación Civil STV

Lagos de Moreno Airfield (Spanish: Aeropuerto Nacional de Lagos de Moreno); officially Aeropuerto Nacional Francisco Primo de Verdad (Francisco Primo de Verdad National Airport) (IATA: LOM, ICAO: MMOO) is a small airstrip located in Lagos de Moreno, Jalisco, Mexico. It handles domestic air traffic and supports flight training and general aviation activities. The airfield does not provide scheduled passenger public services. The nearest airport that serves commercial flights is León/Bajío International Airport.

Situated at an elevation of 1,880 metres (6,170 ft) above mean sea level, it features a single asphalt runway, designated as 04/22, measuring 1,200 by 20 metres (3,937 by 66 ft). Adjacent facilities include small hangars, an apron with parking positions for aircraft, and a small terminal building. The airport is named after Francisco Primo de Verdad y Ramos, a lawyer and politician.

Over the years, the airfield has experienced intermittent service by regional airlines, offering seasonal flights within the region. From 1994 until 2000, commercial flights were operated by TAESA, Mexico's third-largest airline at the time. These flights included regular routes to Mexico City, Tijuana, and at times also to Guadalajara and Zacatecas. In 2012, there were plans by Mexican investors to establish Lagos de Moreno as a cargo airport; however, this initiative did not materialize.

== See also ==
- List of the busiest airports in Mexico
- List of airports in Mexico
- List of airports by ICAO code: M
- List of busiest airports in North America
- List of the busiest airports in Latin America
- Transportation in Mexico
- Tourism in Mexico
- León/Bajío International Airport
