= Ángel Alonzo =

Mexican footballer (born 2000)

Personal information
- Full name: Ángel David Alonzo Meneses
- Date of birth: 27 January 2000 (age 26)
- Place of birth: Teocaltiche, Mexico
- Height: 1.85 m (6 ft 1 in)
- Position: Goalkeeper

Youth career
- Necaxa

Senior career*
Years	Team	Apps	(Gls)
2019–2020	Necaxa	3	(0)
2020–2021	→ Alebrijes de Oaxaca (loan)	23	(0)
- * Club domestic league appearances and goals as of 5 February 2021

Ángel David Alonzo Meneses (born 27 January 2000) is a Mexican professional footballer who plays as a goalkeeper.

== International career ==
In April 2019, Alonzo was included in the 21-player squad to represent Mexico at the U-20 World Cup in Poland.

== Career statistics ==
=== Club ===
As of 4 May 2019

Club	Season	League			Cup		Continental		Other		Total	
Club	Season	Division	Apps	Goals	Apps	Goals	Apps	Goals	Apps	Goals	Apps	Goals
Necaxa Premier	2018–19	Liga Premier - Serie A	2	0	–		–		0	0	2	0
Necaxa	2018–19	Liga MX	0	0	2 (Note: Appearances in the Copa MX)	0	–		0	0	2	0
Career total			2	0	2	0	0	0	0	0	4	0
