= José Rosas Moreno =

Mexican writer (1838–1883)

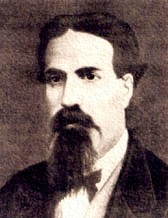
- Born: August 14, 1838; Lagos de Moreno, Jalisco, Mexico
- Died: July 13, 1883; León, Guanajuato, Mexico
- Occupations: writer, journalist
- Writing career
- Genre: Fable

José Rosas Moreno (August 14, 1838 – July 13, 1883) was a Mexican writer of fables of the 19th century, son of Don Ignacio Rosas and Doña Olaya Moreno.

== Public office ==
He studied early on in León, Guanajuato before later entering the Colegio de San Gregorio in Mexico City. He always was a liberal thinker, ready to ask for ideas and opinions. After the restoration of the republic, he was at various times a deputy in General Congress. He was the person in charge of the foundation of various newspapers, as well as occupier of various public offices, like the Leon city hall register, deputy to the Legislature of Guanajuato, and later to the Congress of the Union.

== Career ==
He was a poet of minor tone. His various lyrical works contain mildness and sweetness, nostalgia and gentle melancholy. He also wrote various plays for children, poems about the history of Mexico and children's reading books. A part of his poems was published in 1891 under the title "Ramo de violetas" with a prologue by Ignacio Altamirano." "La vuelta a la aldea" is one of his last romantics, showing the influence of the works of Bécquer in Mexican poetry. He also wrote lyric poetry, and helped to cultivate drama with an artistic feel.

He is commonly considered as the best Mexican fabulist and is known as the "Poet of Childhood", producing great poetic and dramatic works directed at children like "El Ratoncillo Ignorante." His fables are some of the best known in all of Mexico.

A theatre in his hometown, the Teatro José Rosas Moreno, bears his name.

== Works in wikisource ==
=== Poetry ===
- El Ratoncillo Ignorante
- El Zenzontle
- La vuelta a la aldea
- ¡Quién pudiera vivir siempre soñando!
- El Valle de Mi Infancia
