= Hernando Martel =

Spanish conquistador (c.1515–??)

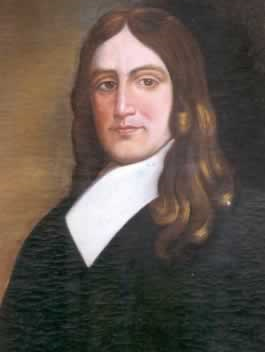
- Don Hernando Martel.
- Born: c. 1515; Seville, Spain
- Died: Santa María de los Lagos, Kingdom of Nueva Galicia (now Lagos de Moreno, Jalisco, Mexico)
- Occupations: Conquistador, colonizer, settler and military officer for the Crown of Castile

Hernando Martel (c. 1515) was a Spanish conquistador, judge, politician and military officer, born in Seville, Spain. He conquered and pacified much of the region of Santa María de los Lagos in the ancient Kingdom of Nueva Galicia, known today as Lagos de Moreno.

== Founder of Santa Maria de los Lagos ==
During the administration of Luís de Velasco as Viceroy of New Spain, several towns came into being in the Kingdom of Nueva Galicia for the primary purpose of consolidating their defenses against the Chichimec raids. One of these was Santa Maria de los Lagos, which the Royal Audience, headed by Licenciado Alonso de Oceguera, ordered established on January 5, 1563. The Audience requested that the "Most Illustrious Lord, Don Hernando Martel, Mayor of Teocaltiche and the Plains of Zacatecas", carry out the foundation with seventy-three noble families from Spain as colonists. In addition to the signature of the founder in the founding document, are those of Captain Pedro de Anda, friar Valadés, a priest, Don Juan de Arrona, the Royal Scribe, Don Juan de Malaga, Don Alonso Macías Valadés, and the illustrious Don Diego Romo de Vivar. The first alcaldes and regidores were elected shortly after the founding, on July 25, 1563.

Captain Martel founded the village in the Spanish style, in the remains of the indigenous Chichimeca and Caxcan cultures. He continued the work undertaken by Juan de Tolosa: tirelessly touring the Chichimeca lands. He participated in the war known as the Mixtón Rebellion, as an officer under the command of Juan de Villalba. He helped to stifle rebellions in places as far away as Compostela. To reward him for his services to the Spanish Crown, half of the Indians of Tepeque were given to him as an encomienda.

Accompanied by his soldiers, and as soon as he was old enough, accompanied by his son Don Hernando Gallegos, Captain Hernando Martel gave protection to settlers and passersby, and frequently entered the Chichimeca camps to rescue kidnapped Spaniards. He was a devout Catholic and a man dedicated to Christian principles and ideals, as well as a faithful servant of his Majesty, King Philip II of Spain. On multiple occasions he appealed to his Majesty for additional funds to help pacify the region, making it safe for arriving colonists. Finally, after multiple requests went unanswered, Don Hernando resorted to paying his troops and purchasing weapons and supplies out of his own pocket. He eventually died penniless.

The Martel dominion over these lands was transferred to his son Don Hernando Gallegos, who for many years served as Mayor of Teocaltiche, extending his government to the newly founded town of our Lady of the Assumption of Aguascalientes, also for many years.

== Family ==
Don Hernando Martel was born in Seville, Spain c. 1515, the son of Don Juan de Escobar and Doña Beatriz Gallegos. He arrived in the Kingdom of New Spain around 1538, possibly already married. The name of his wife remains unknown, but at least one child is known, his son Don Hernando Gallegos who married María de Frías. Beatríz Gallegos, named for the mother of Don Hernando Martel, is mostly likely the granddaughter of the elder Don Hernando Martel and the daughter of Don Hernando Gallegos and María de Frías. She married the criollo Luis Gonzáles. Both died in the town Martel founded.

== Notable descendants ==
- DJ Trevi, American DJ, producer, and actor
