= Pedro de Anda =

Spanish conquistador (c.1551–1619)

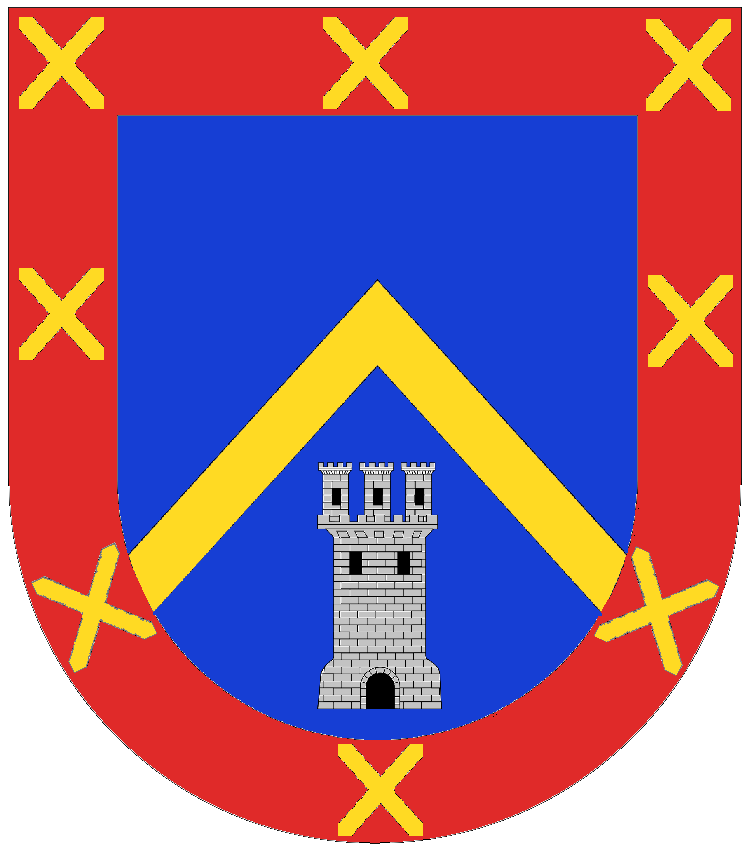
- Born: 1551; Spain
- Died: 27 January 1619 (aged 67–68); Santa María de los Lagos, Kingdom of Nueva Galicia (now Lagos de Moreno, Jalisco, Mexico)
- Occupations: Conquistador for the Crown of Castile; Judge of the Real Audiencia of Guadalajara

Don Pedro de Anda Altamirano (c. 1551 – 27 January 1619) was a Spanish conquistador, judge, and colonizer of New Spain. As a captain in the Spanish Colonial Army, de Anda helped lead the Spanish conquest of the Bajío region of Mexico during the Chichimeca War.

Following the suppression of the Chichimeca people, de Anda helped lead the colonization effort in the Jalisco Highlands and founded the Villa de Santa María de los Lagos, modern day Lagos de Moreno.

== History ==
Pedro de Anda Altamirano was born c. 1551, in Spain, to a family of minor Basque nobility. He served as a captain in the colonial army of New Spain, having notably helped lead the Spanish conquest of the Chichimeca people in the Bajío region of Mexico.

After the conquest of the Chichimecas, de Anda helped lead the colonization of the Jalisco Highlands in the Western Bajío region. In 1563, he and Captain Hernando Martel founded the Villa de Santa María de los Lagos (modern day Lagos de Moreno), along with 73 noble Spanish families and their servants and slaves.

In 1565, Captain de Anda was given a hacienda and a land grant by the Royal Audiencia of the Kingdom of Nueva Galicia outside of Lagos de Moreno named Hacienda el Xaral, which included the famous Mesa Redonda plateau.

== Family ==
Pedro de Anda Altamirano married Beatriz González de Castañeda in 1565, with whom he had two sons:

- Esteban de Anda Altamirano, proprietor of the Tierras de San Nicolás de Frías
- Juan de Anda Altamirano, captain of the Spanish Army in New Spain and husband of Juana Ruiz de Nava.

Captain de Anda's descendants formed part of the colonial elite of the Jaliscan Highlands. Among his descendants include notable writers, politicians, and other prominent Mexican personalities including:

- Fortino Ibarra de Anda (1895-), writer
- José Silverio de Anda Temblador (1838–1907), writer
- José Guadalupe de Anda (1880–1950), Senator of the Republic and writer
- Manuel Romo de Anda, Municipal President of Encarnación de Díaz (1918)
- Miguel de Anda Jacobsen (1927–present), writer and academic
- Elías De Anda Ramírez, Municipal President of San Julián (1929)
- Pedro de Anda Muñoz, Municipal President of San Juan de los Lagos (1932–1933)
- Ramiro Navarro de Anda, footballer for the Mexico national football team in the 1966 FIFA World Cup
- Marcelino Romo de Anda, Municipal President of San Juan de los Lagos (1968–1970)
- Noel Pérez de Anda, Municipal President of San Juan de los Lagos (1971–1973)
- Rafael Pérez de Anda, Municipal President of San Juan de los Lagos (1980–1982)
- Alejandro de Anda Lozano, Municipal President of Lagos de Moreno (2007), San Juan de los Lagos (2007–2009)
- Hugo Zamora de Anda, Municipal President of Lagos de Moreno (2009)
- Juan Alberto Márquez de Anda, Municipal President of Lagos de Moreno (2015–2018)
