= Mario Díaz (footballer, born 1960) =

Mexican footballer and manager (born 1960)

Personal information
- Full name: Mario Díaz Pérez
- Date of birth: 12 March 1960 (age 66)
- Place of birth: Teocaltiche, Jalisco, Mexico
- Height: 1.73 m (5 ft 8 in)
- Position: Midfielder

Team information
- Current team: Atlético Valladolid (Assistant)

Senior career*
Years	Team	Apps	(Gls)
1980–1984	Cruz Azul		
1984–1992	Atlético Morelia		

Managerial career
- 2001: Morelia (Interim)
- 2001–2002: Morelia (Assistant)
- 2003: Jaguares de Tapachula
- 2004: Trotamundos Tijuana (Assistant)
- 2007: Titanes de Tulancingo
- 2010–2011: Monarcas Zacapu
- 2011–2012: Morelia Reserves and Academy (Assistant)
- 2013–2016: Morelia Reserves and Academy
- 2018: Monarcas Zacapu (Assistant)
- 2022–: Atlético Valladolid (Assistant)
- * Club domestic league appearances and goals as of 18:56 UTC, 23 September 2022

Mario Díaz Pérez (born March 12, 1960) is a Mexican football manager and former player.

A native of Jalisco, El Capí Díaz began his professional football career with Cruz Azul in 1980. He joined Atlético Morelia in 1984, and would become a club idol, leading Monarcas to the 1987–88 Mexican Primera División season semi-finals where they would lose to Club América on penalties.
