= Lagos de Moreno =

- Municipality and City
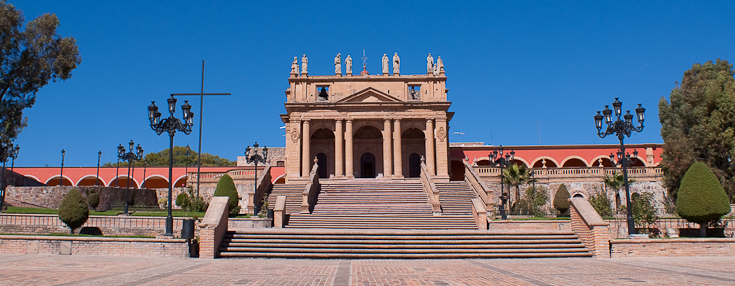
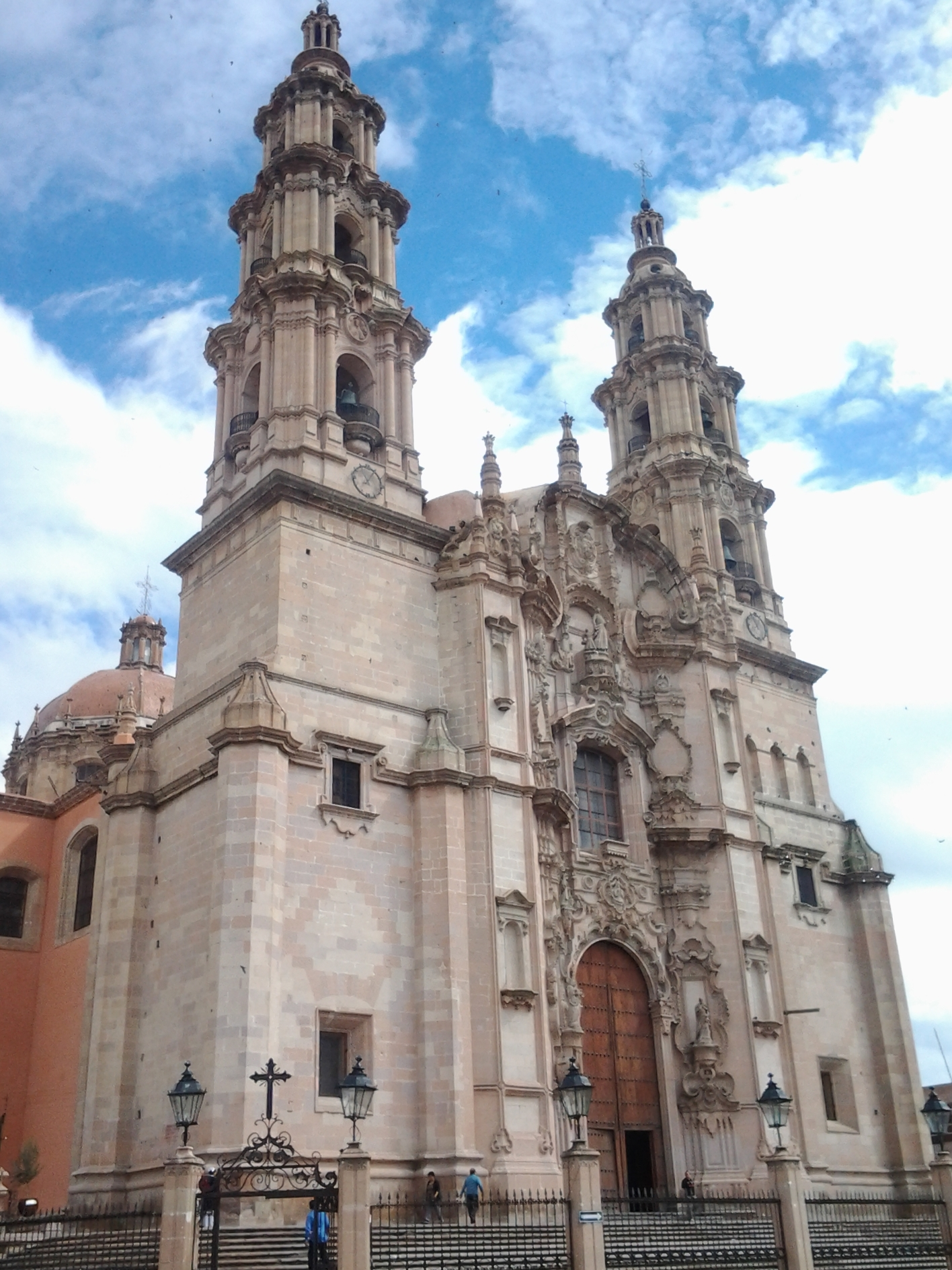
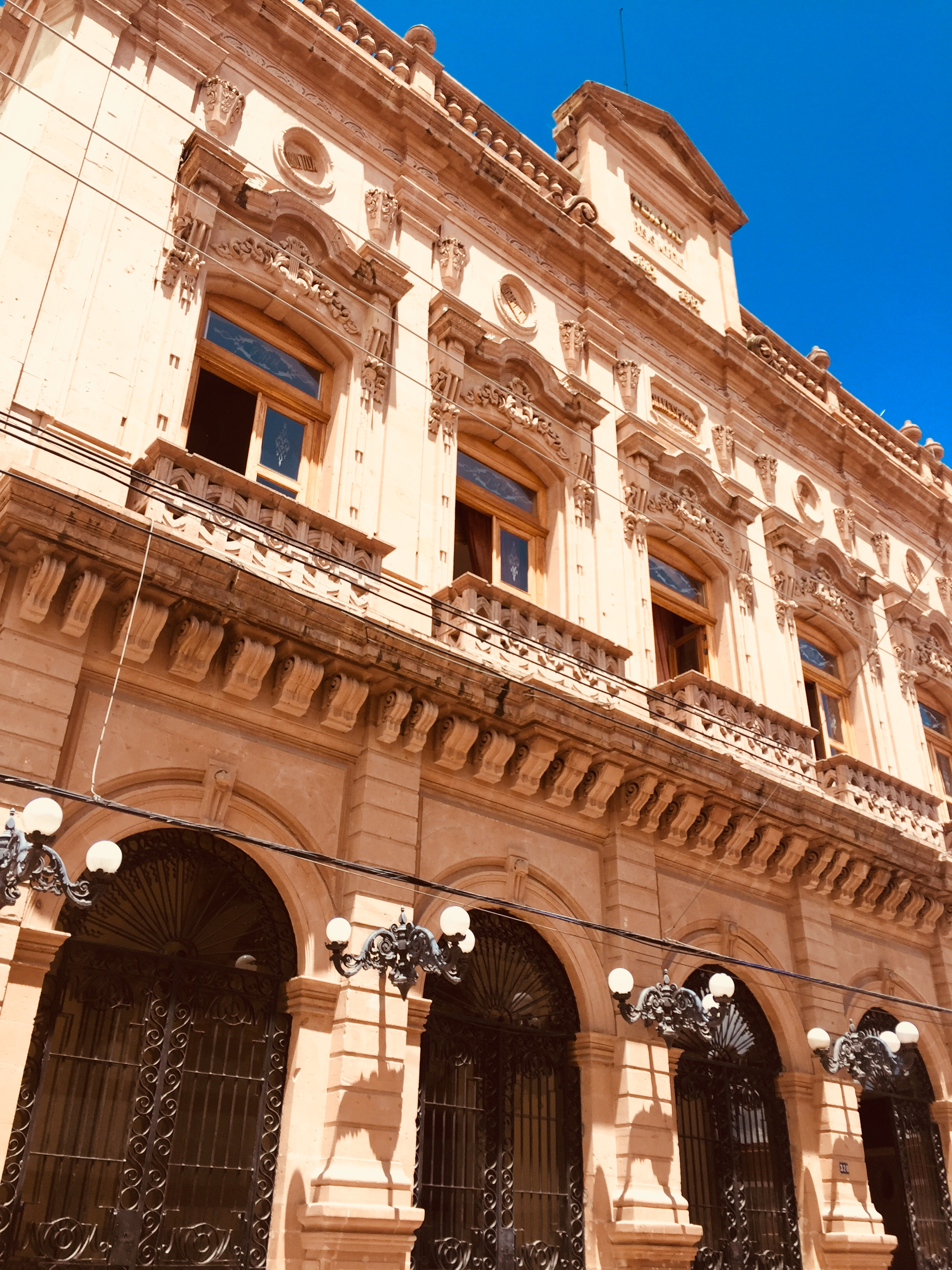
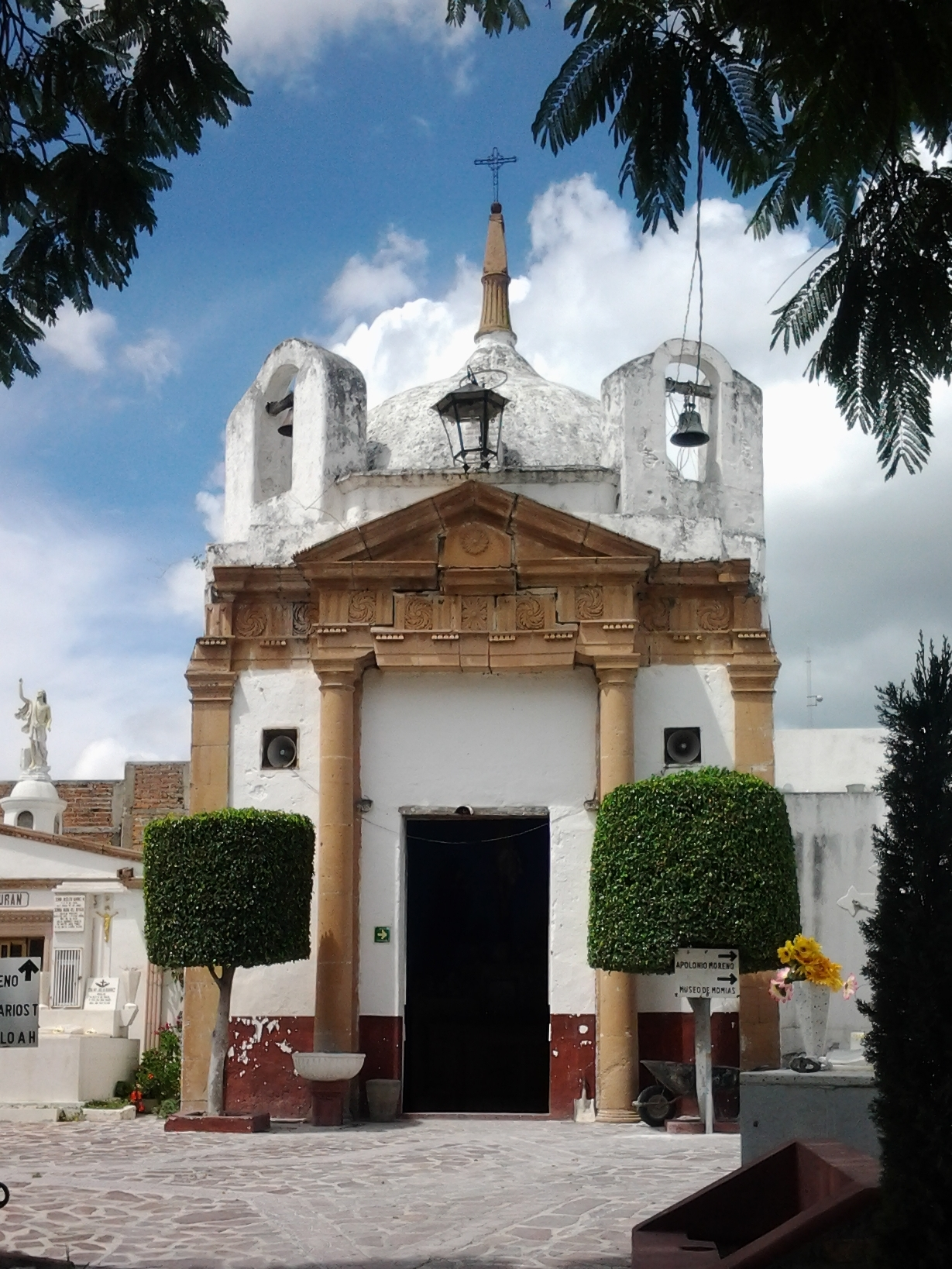
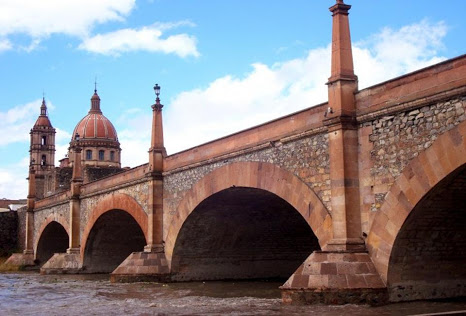
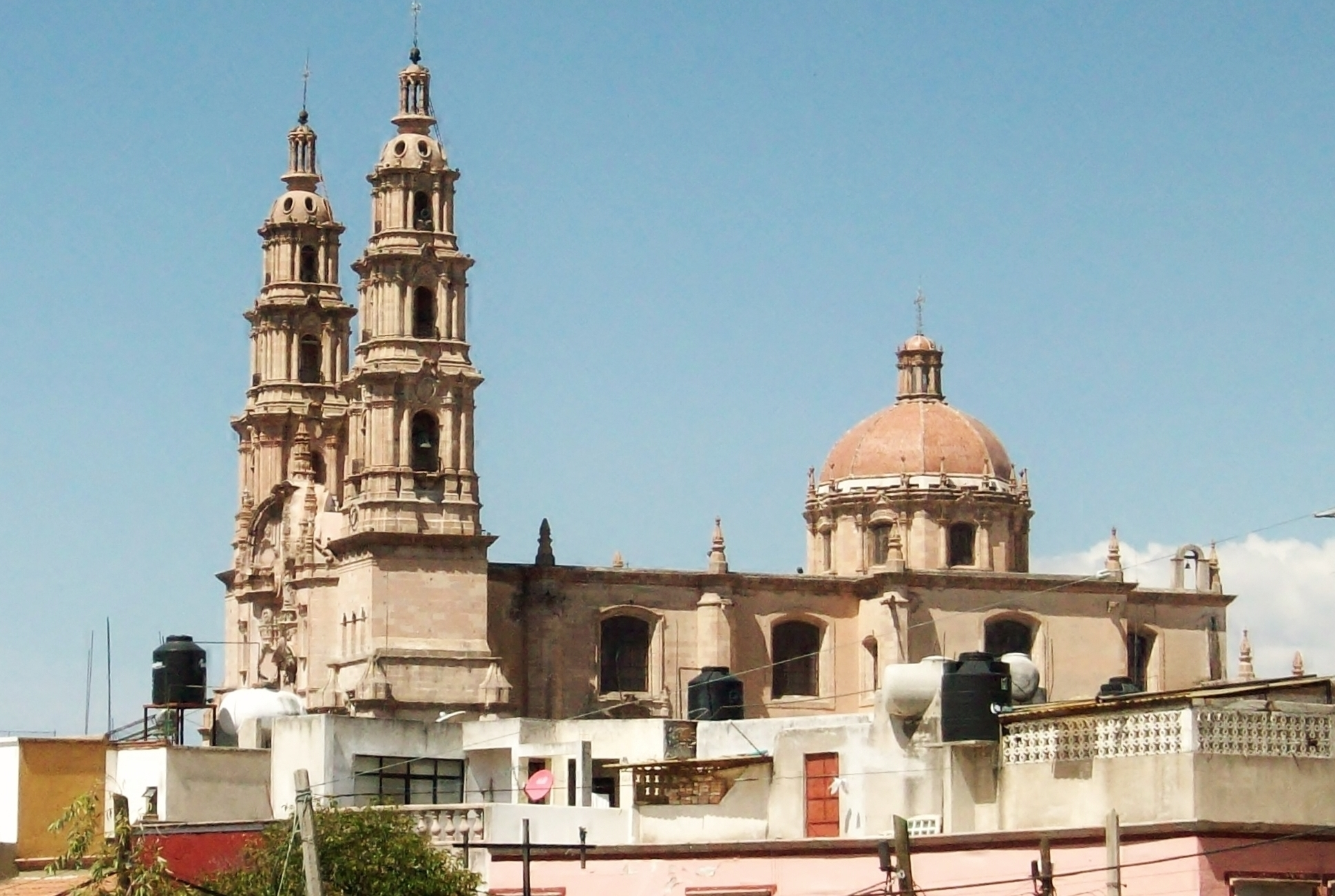
- From left to right and from top to bottom: Templo del Calvario, Teatro José Rosas Moreno, Parroquia Nuestra Señora de la Asunción, Parroquia De Nuestra Señora De La Luz

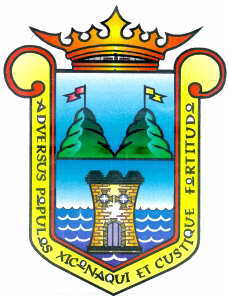
- Coat of arms
- Nickname: Athens of Mexico (Atenas de México)
- Motto: Adversus populos Xiconaqui et Custique fortitudo
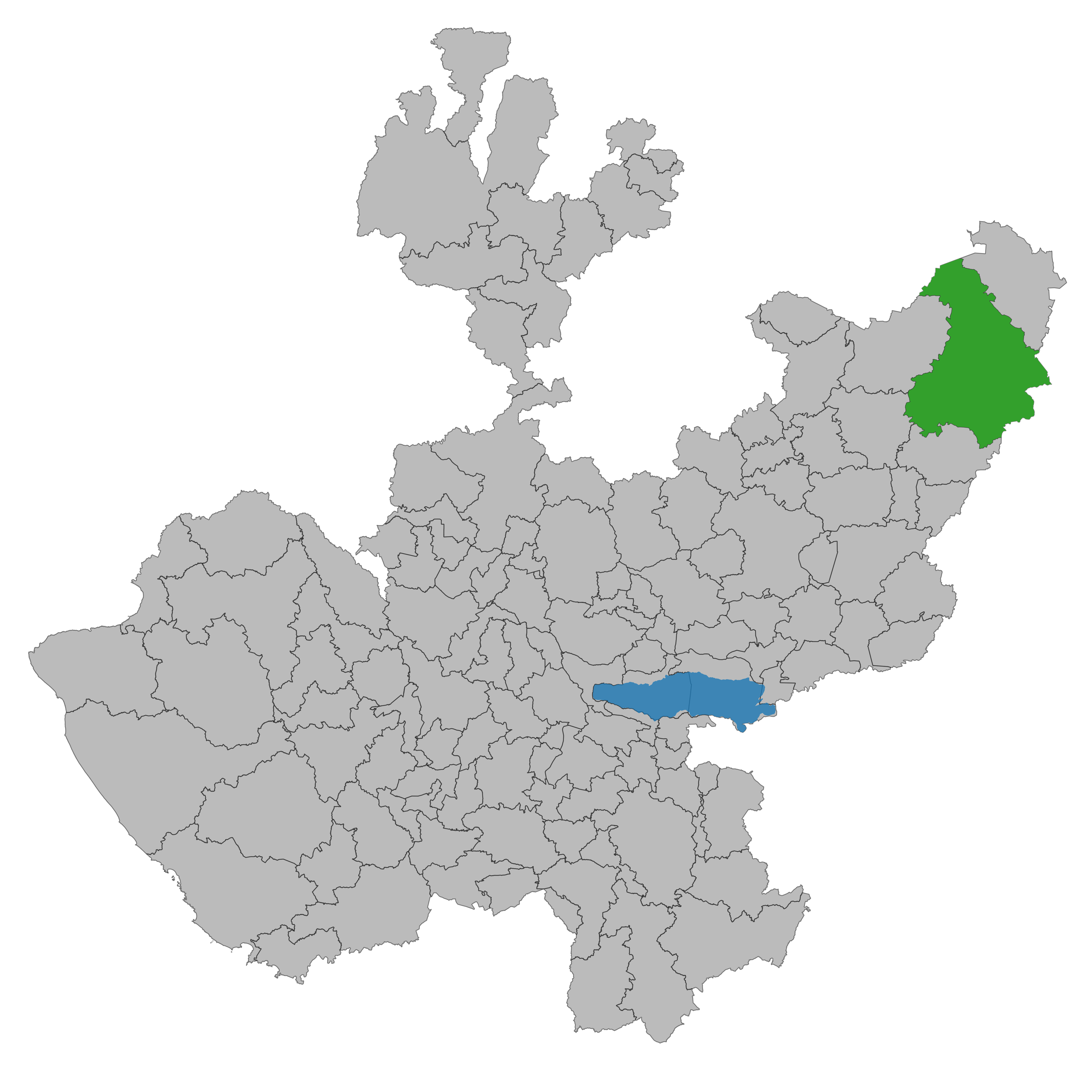
- Location of the municipality in Jalisco

- Location in Mexico
- Coordinates: 21°21′N 101°55′W
- Country: Mexico
- State: Jalisco
- Founded: March 31, 1563
- Founded as: Villa de Santa María de los Lagos
- Founder: Hernando Martel and Pedro de Anda
- Named for: Pedro Moreno and the historical lakes in the region

Government
  - Municipal President: Tecutli José Guadalupe Gómez Villalobos (Movimiento Ciudadano)

Area
  - Municipality: 2,514 km^{2} (971 sq mi)
  - City: 24.72 km^{2} (9.54 sq mi)
- Elevation: 1,942 m (6,371 ft)

Population (2020 census)
  - Municipality: 172,403
  - Density: 68.58/km^{2} (177.6/sq mi)
  - City: 111,569
  - City density: 4,513/km^{2} (11,690/sq mi)
- Demonym: Laguense
- Time zone: UTC–06:00 (Zona Centro)
- Postal code: 47400
- Area code: 474

Lagos de Moreno (Spanish: [ˈlaɣos ðe moˈɾeno]) is a city and municipality in the State of Jalisco, Mexico. Lagos is located in the region of Los Altos de Jalisco, within the macroregion of the Bajío. Lagos de Moreno is occasionally known as the "Athens of Jalisco", owing to the numerous writers and poets who were born there.

Lagos de Moreno was founded as Villa Santa Maria de los Lagos on March 31, 1563, by Don Hernando Martel, an Andalusian conquistador. The town was the economic and cultural center of a region that eventually attracted many ranchers. By 1600 there were over 20,000 cattle in the region. Santa Maria continued growing both physically and culturally, and by the 1800s, the town was elevated to a city and renamed to Lagos de Moreno in honor of Pedro Moreno. Lagos de Moreno was the site of the signing of several important political documents, the two identically named but unrelated Convenios de Lagos. The arts flourished in the city during the latter half of the 19th century, but this literary boom decreased somewhat after the Mexican Revolution, especially during the 1940s. Recently, Lagos de Moreno has become an important cultural and tourist destination thanks to its rich history and architecture, some of which still stands from the 17th century.

As of the 2020 census, the city had a population of 111,569, making it the 6th largest city in the state of Jalisco. The municipality had a population of 172,403 in 2020. It includes many other outlying small communities, the largest of which are Paso de Cuarenta (San Miguel de Cuarenta) and Los Azulitos.

== Etymology ==
The conquistador Hernando Martel gave Lagos de Moreno its original name, Villa de Santa Maria de los Lagos (Town of Saint Mary of the Lakes). The town's name was derived from Saint Mary, the townspeople's chosen patron saint, and the numerous lakes that used to be scattered across the valley. The town was renamed on April 9, 1829, as Lagos de Moreno in honor of Mexican independence hero Pedro Moreno, who was born in the city.

== History ==
=== Pre-hispanic era ===
The origins of Lagos de Moreno date to its founding as Pechichitlán or Teziziatlan by Ahnuvic VII in about 1028 BCE. Then the city served as a capital for the Chichimecatlalli fiefdom. In the 12th century, semi-nomadic Guachichiles occupied the valley and dominated an extensive area stretching from present-day San Juan de los Lagos to southern Coahuila. Before the colonization of Mexico began, indigenous culture thrived in this area, with notable pre-Hispanic architecture being established at Rincón de Mesa, Sauceda, and El Maguey.

=== Colonial era ===
After the fall of the Aztec Empire, explorers set out to explore the western frontier in the Bajio Region. The Spanish expansion in Nueva Galicia was slowed down by several tribes in the vicinity, such as the semi-nomadic Chichimecas and the Guachichiles. To the east of Pechititan, the Guamares inhabited the Guanajuato area, and to the west, the Zacatecos lived. The Zacateco caudillos (chiefs), Xiconaqui and Custique, along with the Chichimecas, struck down multiple Spanish invasions from 1550 to 1590 in the well-known Chichimeca War.

However, encomenderos gradually occupied the Bajio. The first Spaniard to build a hacienda in the Laguense valley was Don Diego de Ibarra. Even so, in 1551, a group of Chichimecas attacked his ranch (La Sauceda and San Antonio) and killed all his animals. The constant raids in the area made, for the time being, made settlement of the Lagos region impossible.

==== Founding of Lagos ====
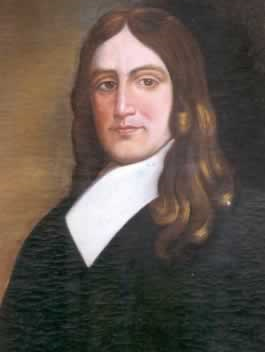
Don Hernando Martel founded Villa Santa Maria de los Lagos in 1563. He and his family held considerable influence over the town in its first few decades.

After decades of constant combat and raids, the first Spanish authorities of the region were appointed; the priest of Teocaltiche and the Mayor of Teocaltiche had the region stretching from Teocaltiche to the Lagos valley as their jurisdiction. Later, the Royal Audiencia of Nueva Galicia ordered the Mayor of Teocaltiche, Don Hernando Martel from Seville, to establish a town in the vicinity of Pechichitan. The new settlement was founded jointly with the first priest and vicar of the local parish, father Juan de Cuenca Virues, who also participated in the official founding of the Real Comanja mine in 1561. As such, on March 31, 1563, Villa de Santa María de los Lagos was founded by Martel, Cuenca, and Pedro de Anda, along with around 100 Spanish noble families.

Development

The residents of Santa Maria chose the Virgin Mary as the namesake of their town and Saint Sebastian as a minor patron saint. The settlement and its surroundings became quite appealing to ranchers; by 1600 around 20,000 head of cattle were active in the Lagos valley, facilitating the eventual creation of the charreria-style rodeo. The increasing population of the area contributed to the naming of the first ordinary Mayor of Santa Maria de los Lagos, the miner Pedro Marfil from Guanajuato. Marfil would be succeeded by Gonzalo Vazquez Baladez, the first and only clergyman to-date to serve as mayor of the town.

The town continued to grow steadily in the 17th century, benefiting from the general prosperity of the Golden Age of the Spanish Empire. In 1615, a new jail was inaugurated, and 1621 saw the construction of a third parish temple with a tower that would be completed by 1685. Religious buildings were created often during this period; the Convent of the Poor Capuchins of Saint Joseph was founded and the construction of the Parish Church of Our Lady of the Assumption and the Temple of Our Lady of the Rosary began during this time.

==== Mexican War of Independence ====
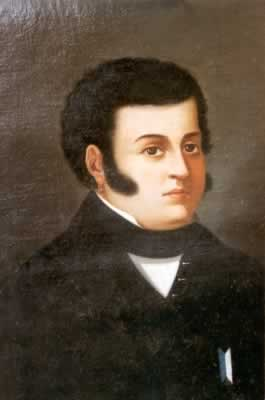
Pedro Moreno, namesake of Lagos de Moreno and hero of the Mexican War of Independence.

Santa Maria de los Lagos, like the rest of New Spain, underwent rapid political change in the early 1800s. Local lawyer Francisco Primo de Verdad y Ramos spoke openly to the colonial authorities, advocating for Mexican independence. However, he soon died under mysterious circumstances in the dungeon of the Mexico City Trustee building. In the initial phase of the war, Father Miguel Hidalgo y Costilla visited Santa Maria de los Lagos and provided religious services there, and recruited some families for the fight against the forces of the Spanish Viceroy.

=== Independence to present ===
Historic Centre of Lagos de Moreno
UNESCO World Heritage Site
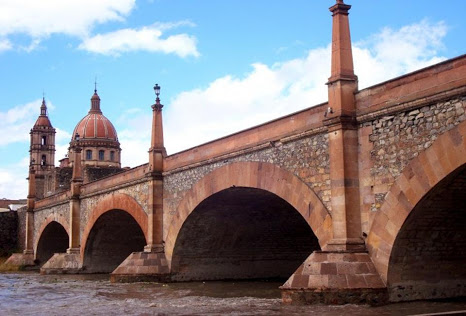
- The historic Lagos Bridge with the Temple of Our Lady of the Light in the distance
- Interactive map of Historic Centre of Lagos de Moreno
- Location: Lagos de Moreno, Jalisco, Mexico
- Criteria: ii, iv
- Reference: 1351-017
- Inscription: 2010 (34th Session)

In 1823, the Convenio de Lagos (Agreement of Lagos) was signed in Santa Maria by Nicolas Bravo, Pedro Celestino Negrete, and Luis Quintanar, establishing the Free and Sovereign State of Jalisco. On March 27, 1824, Santa Maria was given the title of city. On April 9, 1829, the city was renamed as Lagos de Moreno in memory of insurgent General Pedro Moreno (1775–1817), a founding father of Mexico who led forces against Spanish authorities in the Mexican War of Independence.

In 1855, a second and similarly titled Convenio de Lagos (Agreement of Lagos) was signed in Lagos de Moreno, in which Manuel Doblado and Antonio de Haro y Tamariz recognized the Plan of Ayutla, thus joining the movement to topple conservative President Antonio López de Santa Ana. During the Reform War, Lagos de Moreno changed hands between liberal and conservative forces multiple times until an eventual liberal victory in 1861.

During the Mexican Revolution in the 1910s, residents of Lagos de Moreno like Mariano Azuela and Francisco Guerrero Ramirez joined the fighting. In the subsequent Cristero War, the nearby Mesa Redonda was the site of a battle between federal troops and rebel forces.

In 1963, Lagos de Moreno celebrated the 400th anniversary of its founding. In recent times, the city has received several important titles. It has been named an Area of Historical Monuments by the National Institute of Anthropology and History (INAH) in 1989, a World Heritage Site on the Camino Real "Tierra Adentro" by UNESCO on August 1, 2010, and "Pueblo Mágico" by SECTUR on November 16, 2012.

== Geography ==
=== Climate ===
Lagos de Moreno has a subtropical highland climate (Köppen climate classification Cwb) with mild temperatures year round. Temperatures are generally similar for any given month, but daily high and low fluctuations can be very sharp in the winter due in part to the city's altitude and its uneven surroundings. Winters are mild with an average maximum temperature of 23 °C (73.4 °F) in January although nighttime temperatures are often cold, with an average minimum temperature of 3 °C (37.4 °F). Many days are sunny, averaging around 15-19 clear days per month and precipitation is low. Nighttime temperatures regularly fall below 0 °C (32.0 °F) but extended periods of frost are rare.

The Bajio's two main seasons are the rainy season and the dry season. The rainy season, which runs from June to October, sees an increase in precipitation and humidity, with July and August being the months with the most precipitation. The record high was 42.0 °C (107.6 °F) on March 26, 1942 and the record low was −9.0 °C (15.8 °F) on January 24, 1955. The table below shows detailed statistics on the climate of Lagos de Moreno.

Climate data for Lagos de Moreno (1991–2020 normals, extremes 1942–2020)
Month	Jan	Feb	Mar	Apr	May	Jun	Jul	Aug	Sep	Oct	Nov	Dec	Year
Record high °C (°F)	35.5 (95.9)	39.0 (102.2)	42.0 (107.6)	37.5 (99.5)	41.5 (106.7)	40.0 (104.0)	36.0 (96.8)	36.0 (96.8)	34.5 (94.1)	39.5 (103.1)	34.0 (93.2)	33.0 (91.4)	42.0 (107.6)
Mean daily maximum °C (°F)	23.5 (74.3)	25.8 (78.4)	28.0 (82.4)	30.1 (86.2)	31.2 (88.2)	29.5 (85.1)	27.4 (81.3)	27.3 (81.1)	26.8 (80.2)	26.7 (80.1)	25.2 (77.4)	23.8 (74.8)	27.1 (80.8)
Daily mean °C (°F)	13.5 (56.3)	15.2 (59.4)	17.3 (63.1)	19.7 (67.5)	21.5 (70.7)	21.9 (71.4)	20.6 (69.1)	20.5 (68.9)	20.0 (68.0)	18.4 (65.1)	15.9 (60.6)	13.9 (57.0)	18.2 (64.8)
Mean daily minimum °C (°F)	3.3 (37.9)	5.1 (41.2)	6.6 (43.9)	9.2 (48.6)	11.8 (53.2)	14.3 (57.7)	13.9 (57.0)	13.6 (56.5)	13.1 (55.6)	10.0 (50.0)	6.5 (43.7)	3.9 (39.0)	9.3 (48.7)
Record low °C (°F)	−9.0 (15.8)	−7.5 (18.5)	−4.5 (23.9)	−1.0 (30.2)	1.0 (33.8)	3.0 (37.4)	4.0 (39.2)	5.0 (41.0)	1.0 (33.8)	−3.0 (26.6)	−6.0 (21.2)	−5.2 (22.6)	−9.0 (15.8)
Average precipitation mm (inches)	14.4 (0.57)	10.7 (0.42)	9.4 (0.37)	9.4 (0.37)	27.5 (1.08)	110.8 (4.36)	146.7 (5.78)	118.7 (4.67)	98.2 (3.87)	38.5 (1.52)	12.4 (0.49)	10.3 (0.41)	607.0 (23.90)
Average precipitation days (≥ 0.1 mm)	1.8	1.2	1.1	1.3	4.0	10.5	13.7	12.2	10.0	4.5	1.4	1.3	63.0
Average relative humidity (%)	59	53	48	48	51	64	70	73	72	68	64	64	61
Mean monthly sunshine hours	231.3	240.7	273.5	282.5	289.9	230.4	224.8	223.3	203.2	241.4	244.8	214.5	2,900.3
Source 1: Servicio Meteorológico Nacional
Source 2: Colegio de Postgraduados (sun and humidity 1951–1980)

=== Topography ===
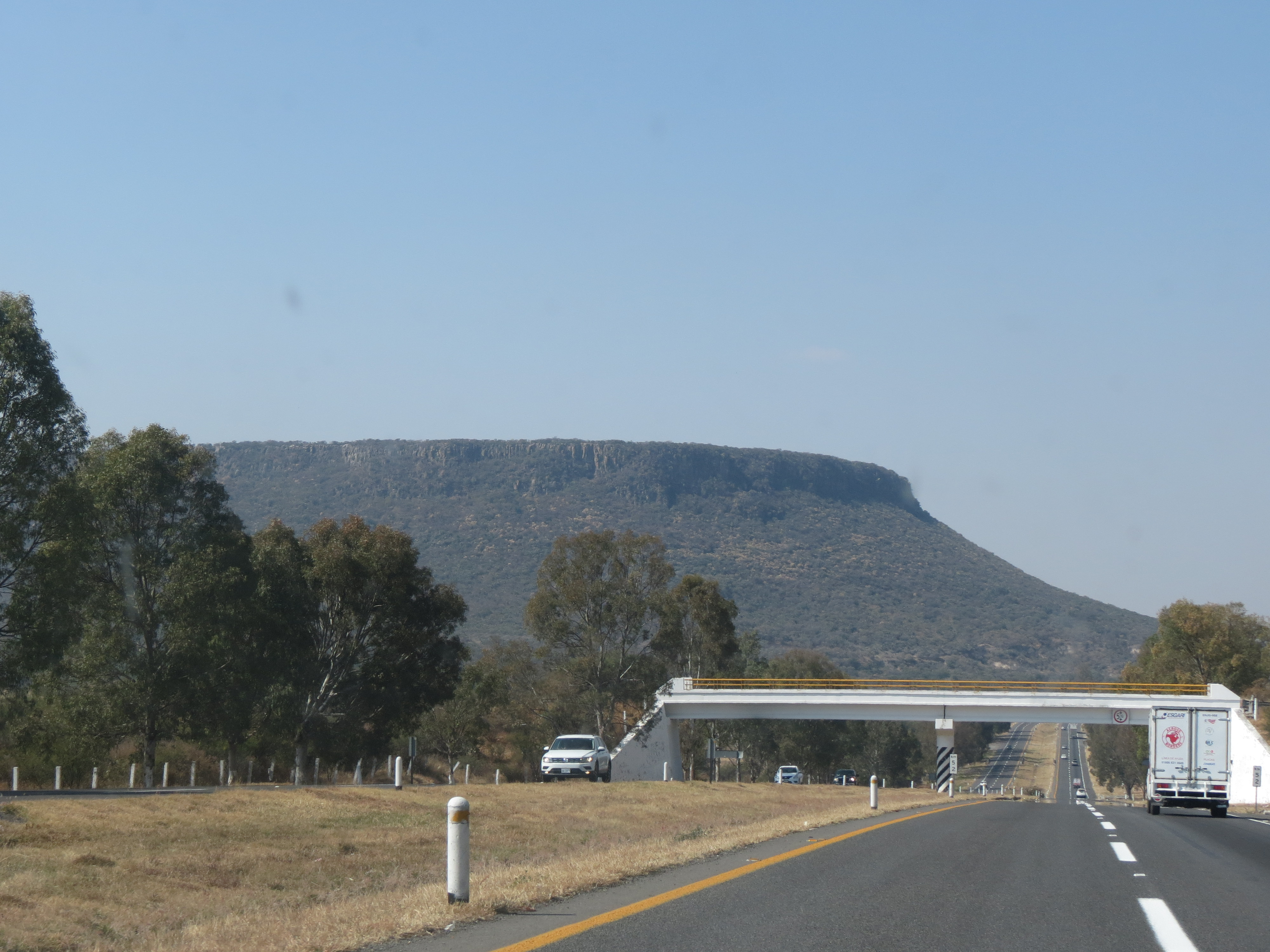
A view of the Mesa Redonda from the nearby highway. Mesa Redonda was the site of a Cristero War battle.

Lagos de Moreno is situated 1,942 meters (6,371 feet) above mean sea level. Lagos is located in the region of Los Altos de Jalisco, within the macroregion of the Bajío, one of the most highly developed areas in Latin America. The city's vicinity is quite mountainous and hilly, with the nearby Mesa Redonda being a particularly notable formation.

=== Flora and fauna ===
The nearby Mesa Redonda is home to many unique species of flora. There, two species of cactus endemic only to Jalisco flourish, with one of these species only being endemic to the Mesa Redonda, particularly its very steep slopes, protecting it from predators.

Many animals call the Lagos valley home, with fauna including hares, rabbits, deer, and boars. Residents of nearby ranches have commented on the presence of coyotes and snakes in rural areas. Areas like the Mesa Redonda have been utilized by locals to gather vegetables straight from nature, particularly prickly pear cacti.

== Demographics ==
As of the 2020 Mexican census, the city had a population of 111,569, making it the 6th largest city in the state of Jalisco. The municipality as a whole had an estimated population of 164,981 in 2015. The municipality has a slightly higher female population, with 88,426 females compared to 83,977 males.

In Lagos de Moreno city, 38,024 dwellings were enumerated, with 38,002 of these being private households. Of the private residences, 30,020 were inhabited; and in turn, of the inhabited private residences: 29,817 had non-dirt flooring; 29,64 had electricity; 29,919 had sanitary facilities; and 29,941 had drainage.

== Notable people ==
=== Athletics ===
- Luis Fernando Macías, professional cyclist, silver medalist at the 2009 Pan-American Road and Track Championship
- Armando Reynoso Gutiérrez, baseball player for the Mexico national team, Mexican Baseball Hall of Fame member
- Isaác Brizuela Muñoz, Mexican-American footballer for C.D. Guadalajara
- Carmelo Reyes González, former professional wrestler

=== Culture ===
- Lola Álvarez Bravo, famed photographer, prominent figure of the post-Mexican Revolution artistic renaissance
- Juan Pablo Villalobos, author and entrepreneur
- José Rosas Moreno, 19th-century writer, fableist, and poet
- Mariano Azuela González, 19th/20th-century literary critic, novelist, and essayist

=== Politics ===
- Pedro de Anda, Spanish conquistador and founder of Lagos de Moreno
- Luis Alfonso de Alba Góngora, Mexican under-secretary for Latin America in the Secretary of Foreign Relations, former Mexican Representative to the United Nations
- Ramón Muñoz Gutiérrez, Senator of Jalisco in the Mexican Senate of the Republic
- Emilio González Márquez, former Governor of Jalisco
- Pedro Moreno, general and father of the Mexican War of Independence
- Francisco Primo de Verdad y Ramos, 18th-century lawyer and politician of colonial New Spain

=== Religion ===
- Juan Manuel Martín del Campo, Roman Catholic priest and exorcist, titled as Venerable by Pope Francis

== Government ==
=== Mayors and municipal presidents ===
Subjects and citizens who have served as mayors or municipal presidents of Lagos de Moreno

Officer	Term	Office	Notes
Pedro Marfil	1563-1567	Ordinary mayor	Founder
Luis López	1567-1569	Ordinary mayor	Founder
Pedro de Villafaña	1569-1580	Ordinary mayor	Founder
Lope Sánchez de Uréchiga	1580-1609	Ordinary mayor	
Lorenzo de Padilla Dávila	1609-1611	Ordinary mayor	
Fernando de Villegas Jara	1611-1616	Ordinary mayor	
Juan de Arredondo y Bracamontes	1616-1624	Senior mayor	
Pedro de Aranda	1624-1650	Senior mayor	
Captain Antonio de Villegas Jara	1650-1651	Senior mayor	
Joseph González	1651	Senior mayor	
Captain Antonio de Esquivel y Vargas	1653	Senior mayor	
Antonio Ximénez de Castro	1659	Senior mayor	
Captain Juan de Alarcón Faxardo	1662	Senior mayor	
Captain Diego González de la Torre	1663	Senior mayor	
Captain Diego Flores de la Torre	1672	Senior mayor	
Francisco de Villaviciosa	1679	Senior mayor	
Captain Juan Rincón Gallardo	1688	Senior mayor	
Felipe de Otadui y Avendaño	1692	Senior mayor	
Fernando Hurtado de Mendoza	1694	Senior mayor	
Captain Jerónimo Antonio Chacón	1707	Senior mayor	
Sebastián de Manzano	1727	Senior mayor	
Juan Pérez Franco y Hermosillo	1736	Senior mayor	
Miguel Jerónimo del Villar	1737	Senior mayor	
Bernabé Felipe de Torres Ortega	1738	Senior mayor	
Carlos de San Gil y Ram.	1758	Senior mayor	
Francisco Javier de Arriola	1775	Senior mayor	
Juan de Anaya	1778	Senior mayor	
Diego Romero de Chávez	1790	Senior mayor	Main character in the book El Alcalde de Lagos y otras consejas (The Mayor of Lagos and other stories), by Alfonso de Alba Martín (1957)
Alonso de Ceballos y Villagutierre	1794	Senior mayor	
Juan José de Echarte	1808–1810	Military commander	
José María Sanromán	1809	Senior mayor	
Buenaventura Anaya	1810	Senior mayor	
Rafael Flores	1811–1814	Military commander	
Hermenegildo Rebuelta	1814–1821	Military commander	
Quirino Sanromán	1821–1824	Military commander	
Juan Crescencio Hermosillo	1843	Political chief	
Bruno Rey	1857	Political chief	
Juan García Rebollo	1858	Prefect	
Prudencio Topete	1860	Political chief	
Juan Zermeño	1863	Prefect, conservative	
Bernardo Olivero	1866	Prefect, conservative	
Albino Aranda	1868	Political chief	
Antonio Barajas	1876	Political chief	
Juan Alatorre	1873	Political chief	
Camilo Anaya	1874	Political chief	
José María Sanromán	1875	Political chief	
Pedro Vega	1880	Political chief	
José Ignacio Torres	1881	Political chief	
Andrés Michel	1883	Political chief	
Colonel Francisco de Paula Méndez	1887	Political chief	
José de Urrea	1888	Political chief	
Abraham Arróniz	1890	Political chief	
M. Morelos	1891	Political chief	
Abraham Arróniz	1892	Political chief	
Lt. Col. Ignacio Montenegro	1895	Political chief	
José María Arce	1897	Political chief	
Lt. Col. Jesús L. Patiño	1898	Political chief	
José María Gutiérrez	1900	Political chief	
Mayor Rosendo Híjar y Haro	1901	Political chief	
Margarito González Rubio	1903	Political chief	
Jesús Gómez Portugal	1909	Political chief	
Lorenzo I. Calderón	1911	Political chief	
Alberto Macedo	1913	Political chief	
Lt. Col. Ismael Hurtado	1914	Political chief	

Municipal president	Term	Party	Notes
Juan Zúñiga	1916		
Benjamín E. Mora	1917		
Pedro Pons	1918		
Leonardo Larios Paz	1919		
Ramón Vázquez	1920		
José Vega González	1921		
Francisco Montoya	1923		
Luciano Castañeda	1925		
Fernando Zermeño	1926		
Ricardo Anaya	1927		
Miguel Gómez Portugal	1928		
Ramón E. Rivera	1929	PNR	
Jesús Pérez	1934	PNR	
Carlos A. Cuervo	1935	PNR	
Jacobo Lomelín	1935	PNR	
Francisco Carrera	1936	PNR	
Miguel Araujo Soto	1938	PRM	
Salvador J. Camarena	1943	PRM	
Luis Nungaray Garza	1944	PRM	
Alfonso Márquez	1945	PRM	
Ignacio Cedillo	1946	PRI	
José María Padilla	1947	PRI	
Abraham Vega	1948	PRI	
Manuel Vega	1950	PRI	
Enrique Núñez Ortiz	1953	PRI	
Alfonso Escobar	1954	PRI	
Francisco Carrera Hernández	1956	PRI	
Enrique Núñez Ortiz	1953	PRI	
Roberto Moreno	1958	PRI	
José Gutiérrez Zermeño	1959	PRI	
Abraham Vega Padilla	1960	PRI	
Juan José Gómez	1961	PRI	
Juan Anaya Gómez	01-01-1962–31-12-1964	PRI	
Carlos González Gómez	1965	PRI	
José A. Villagrán	1966	PRI	
Rubén Martín Urzúa	1967	PRI	
Jesús Delgado Pérez	01-01-1968–31-12-1970	PRI	
Manuel Flores Tostado	01-01-1971–31-12-1973	PRI	
Jorge Sanromán Quiñones	01-01-1974–31-12-1976	PRI	
Alfredo Gallardo Fregoso	01-01-1977–31-12-1979	PRI	
Teodoro Esparza Rojo	1980–1982	PRI	
Víctor Atilano Gómez	1983–1985	PDM	
Tranquilino Martín	1985	PDM	
J. Trinidad Velázquez Torres	1986		
Sergio Esparza	1987		
Emigdio Rico Santana	1988		
Ignacio Padilla Hernández	1989–1992	PRI	
Benjamín Gazcón Torres	1992–1995	PRI	
Víctor Manuel Larios Muñoz	1995–1997	PAN	
Francisco Javier Pérez Romero	01-01-1998–31-12-2000	PRI	
Francisco Rafael Torres Marmolejo	01-01-2001–2003	PAN	
Saúl González Fuentes	01-01-2004–31-12-2006	PAN	
Francisco Rafael Torres Marmolejo	01-01-2007–31-12-2009	PAN	
José Brizuela López	01-01-2010–30-09-2012	PRI; Panal	Coalition "Alliance for Jalisco"
Hugo René Ruiz Esparza Hermosillo	01-10-2012–30-09-2015	PRI; PVEM	Coalition "Compromise for Jalisco"
Juan Alberto Márquez de Anda	01-10-2015–30-09-2018	PRI; PVEM	
Tecutli José Guadalupe Gómez Villalobos	01-10-2018–02-03-2021	PAN; PRD; MC	Applied for a leave to run for reelection, which he got
José Ignacio Ángel Cervantes	02-03-2021–30-09-2021	PAN; PRD; MC	Acting municipal president
Tecutli José Guadalupe Gómez Villalobos	01-10-2021–30-09-2024	MC	Was reelected on 06-06-2021
Édgar Alfredo González Chávez	01-10-2024–	MC	

== Gallery ==
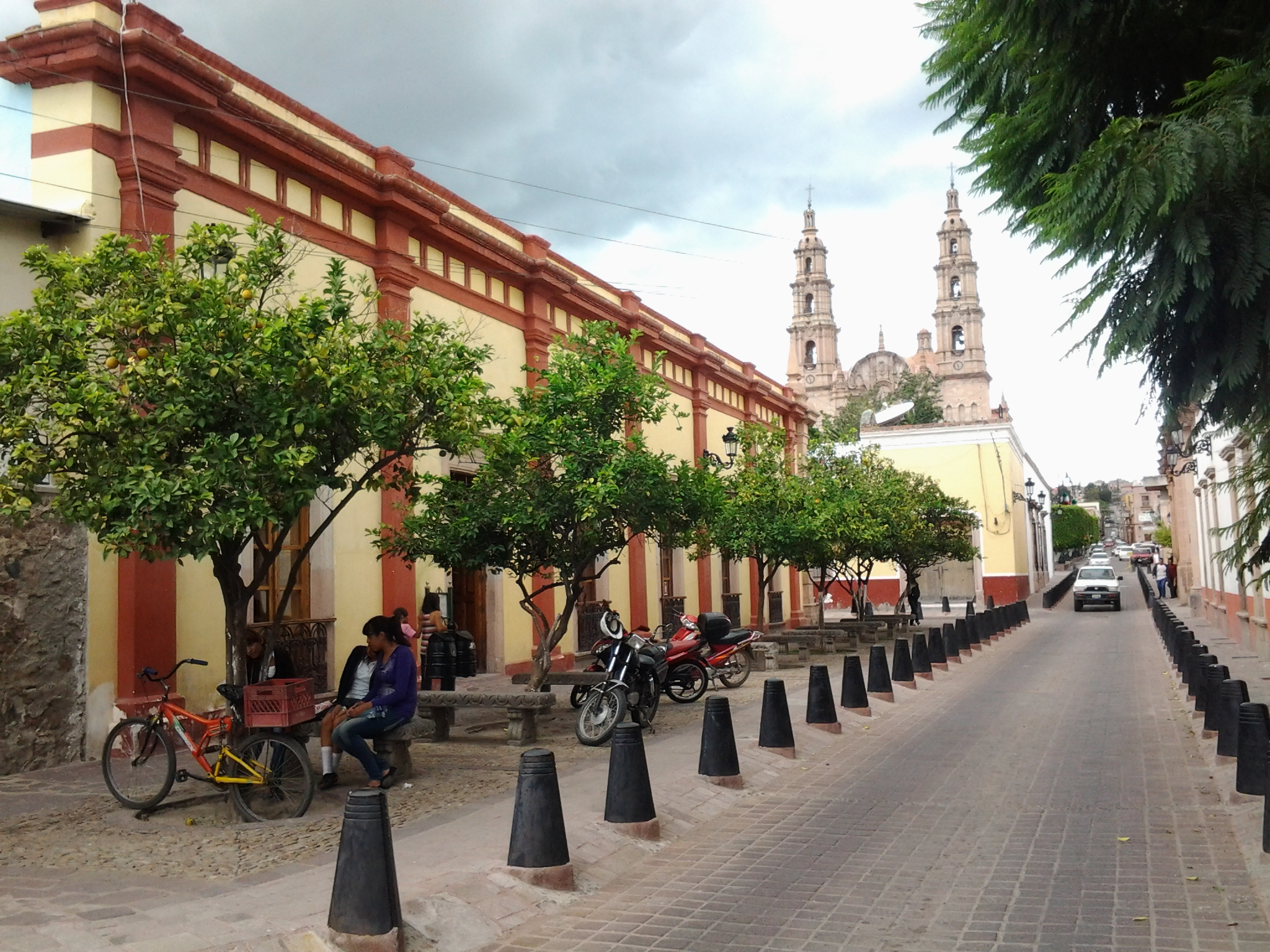
Maria Soine de Helguerra Regional Public Library

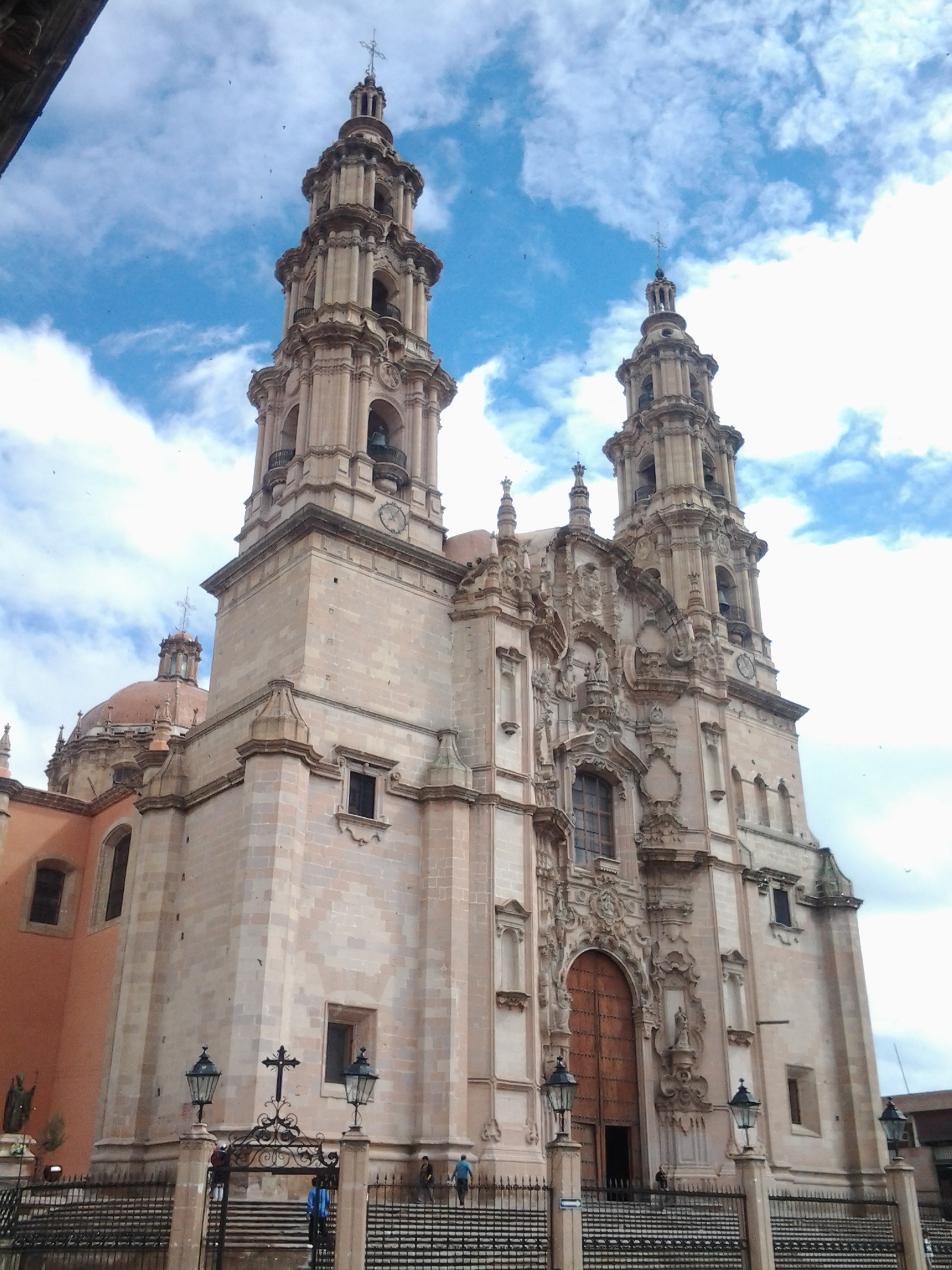
Parroquia Nuestra Señora de la Asunción

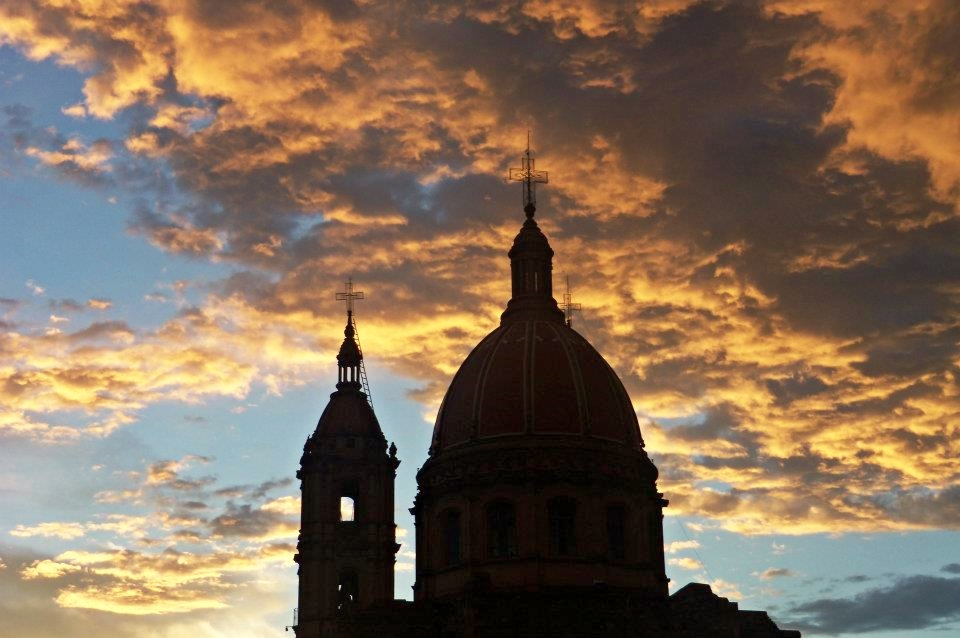
N. Sra. de la Luz Church at sunset

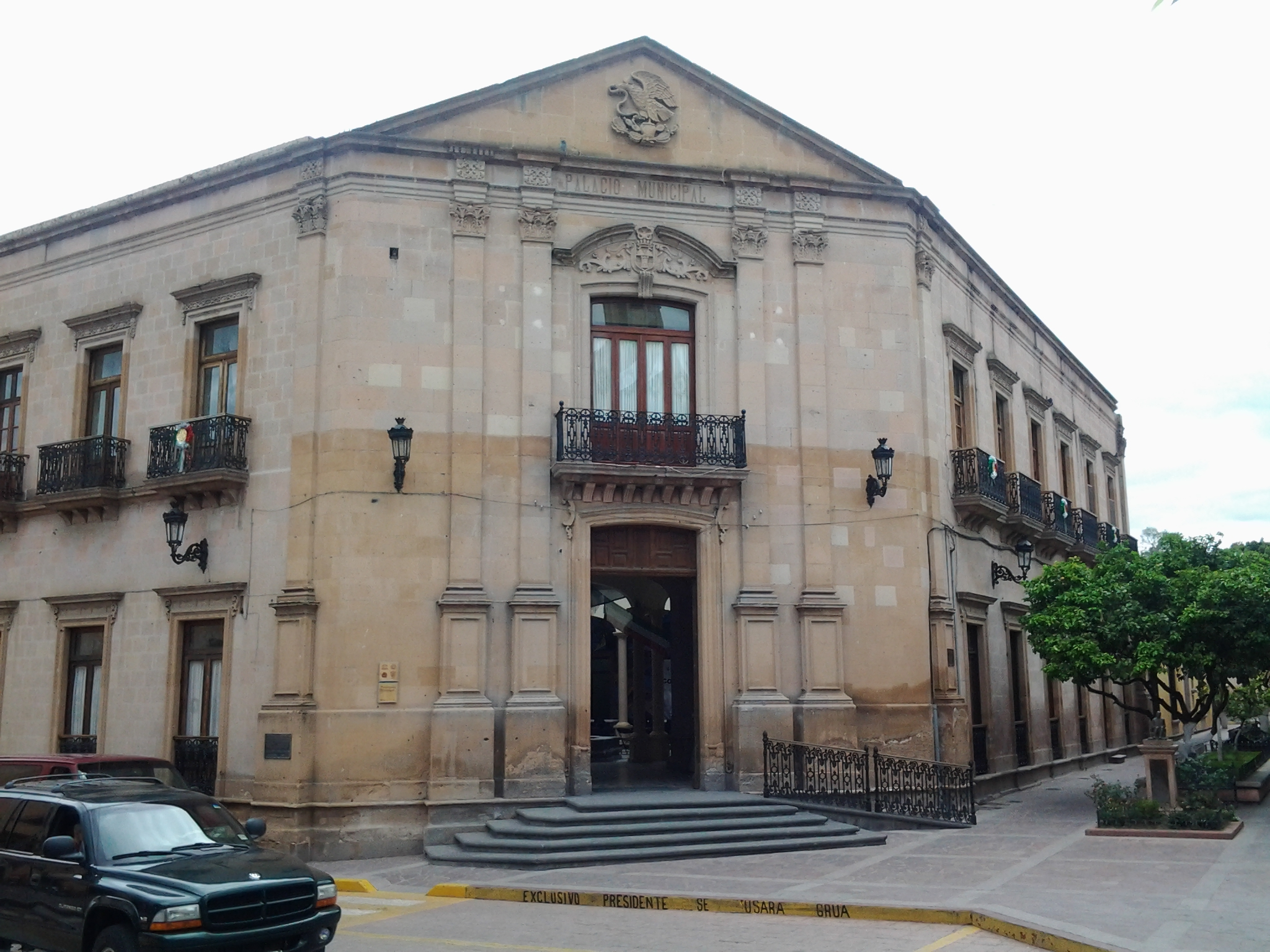
The Municipal Palace of Lagos de Moreno

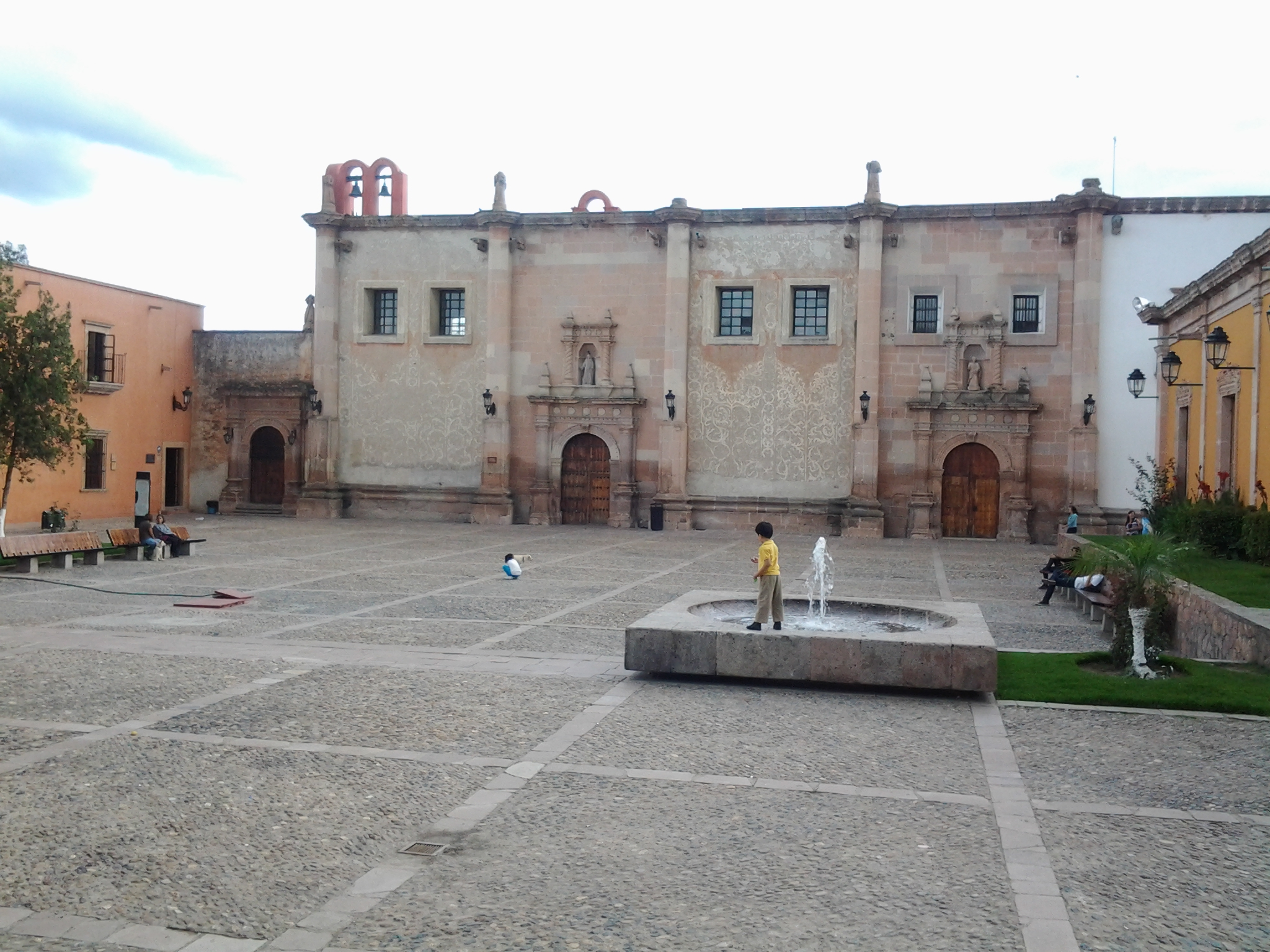
San José de Gracia de Pobres Capuchinas Convent

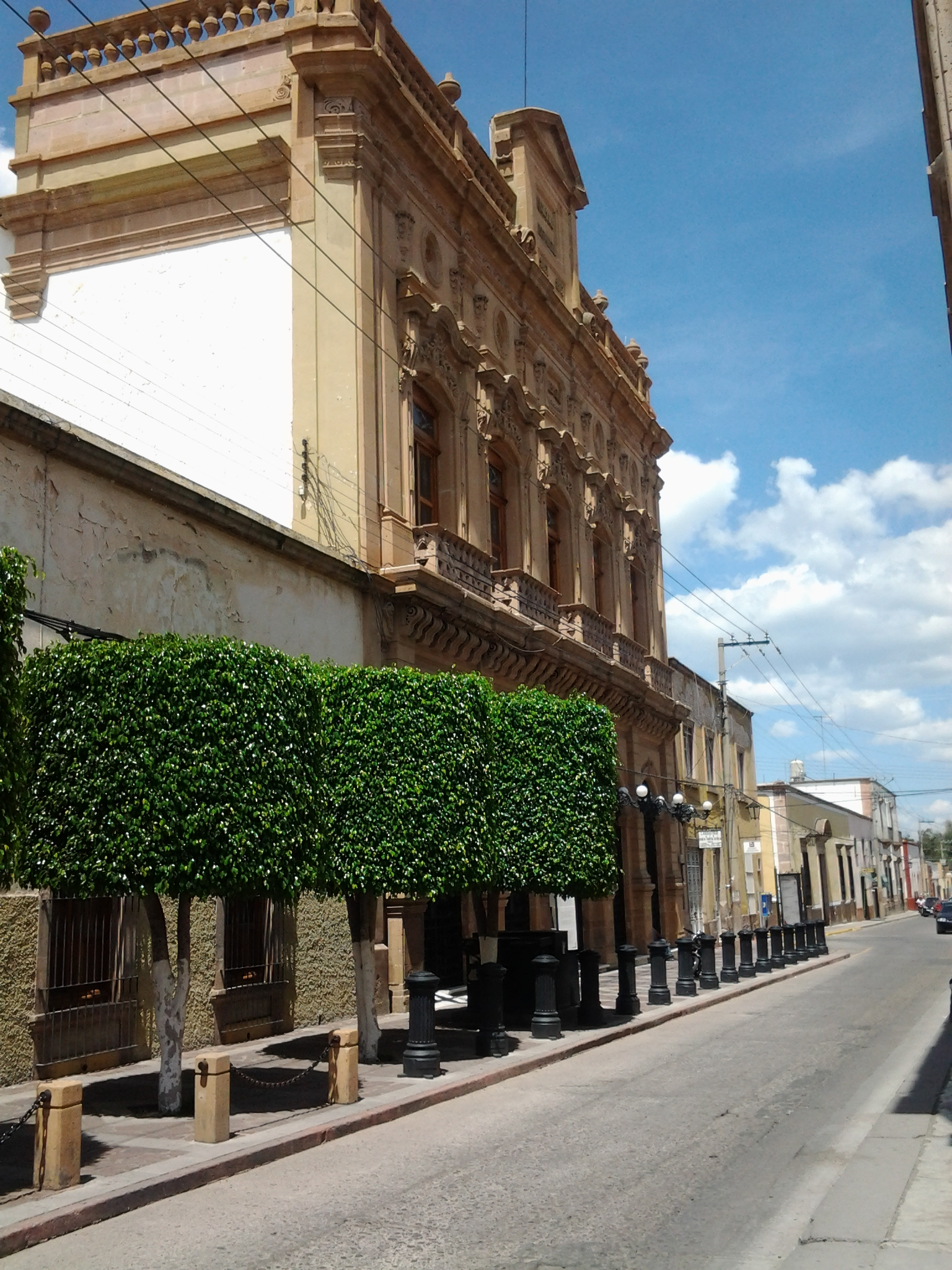
José Rosas Moreno Theatre

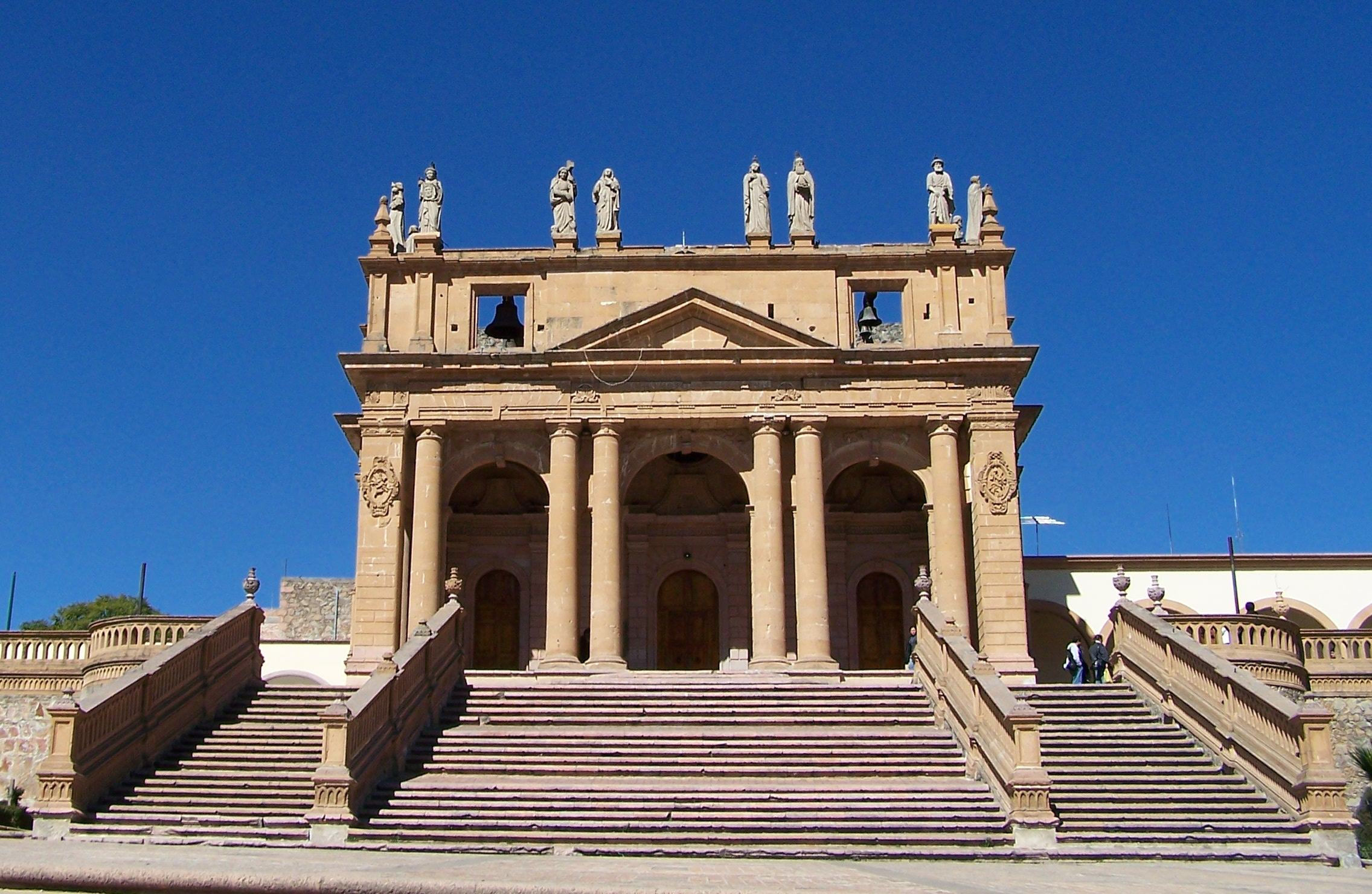
The Temple of Calvario

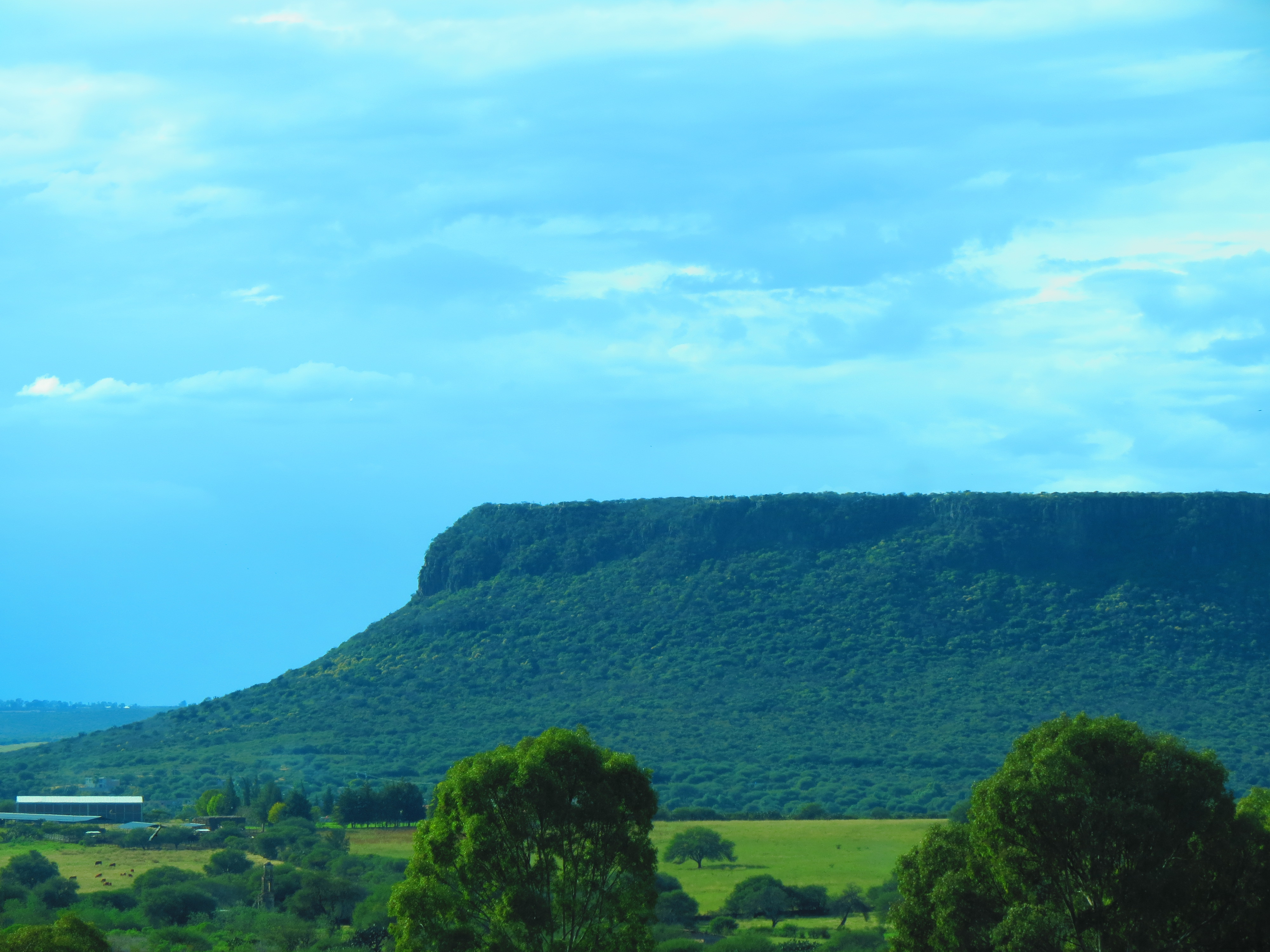
La Mesa Redonda

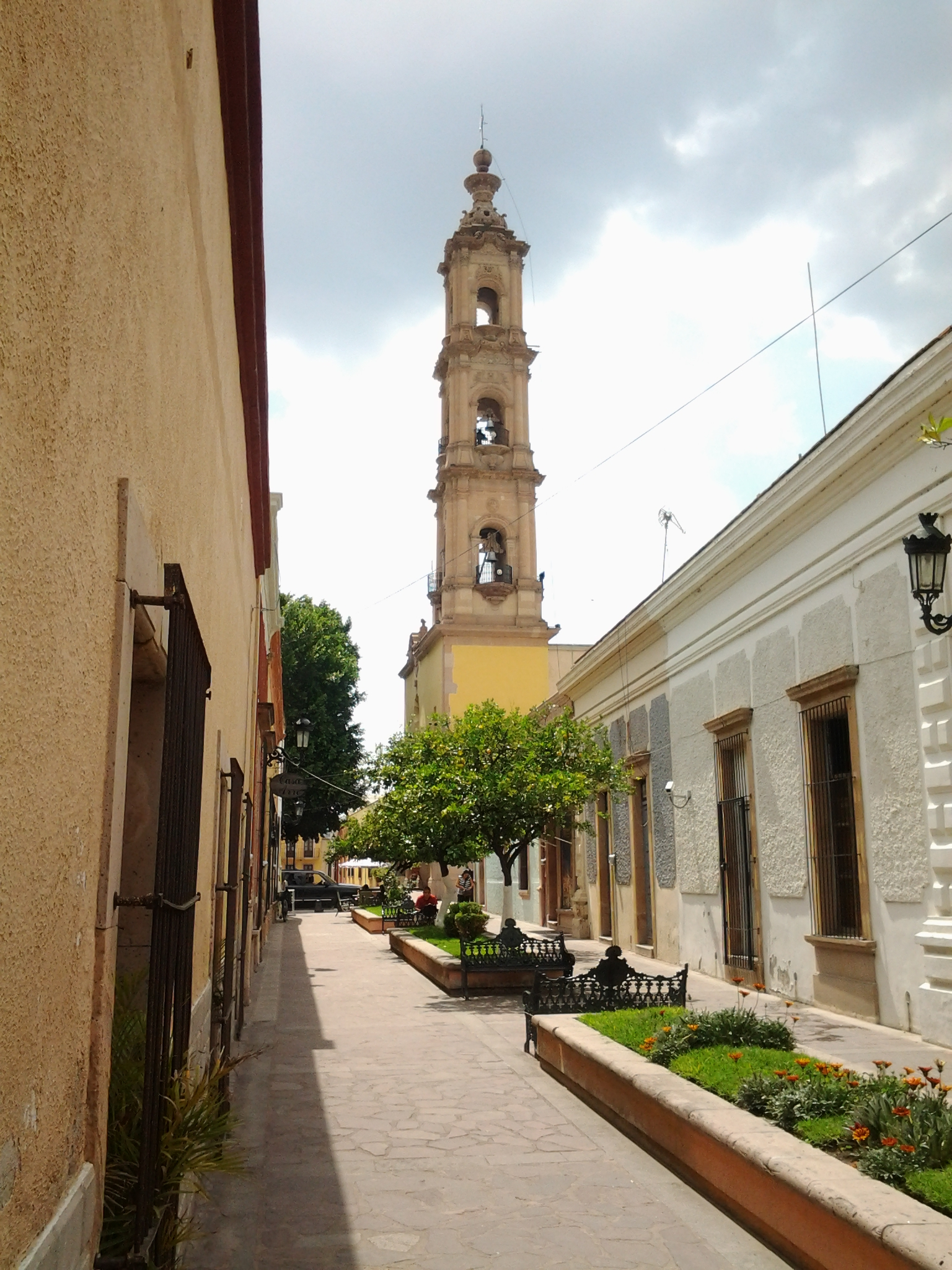
La Merced Temple

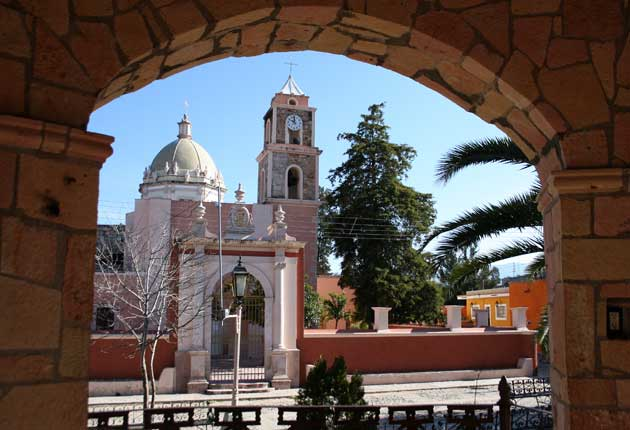
Comanja Temple

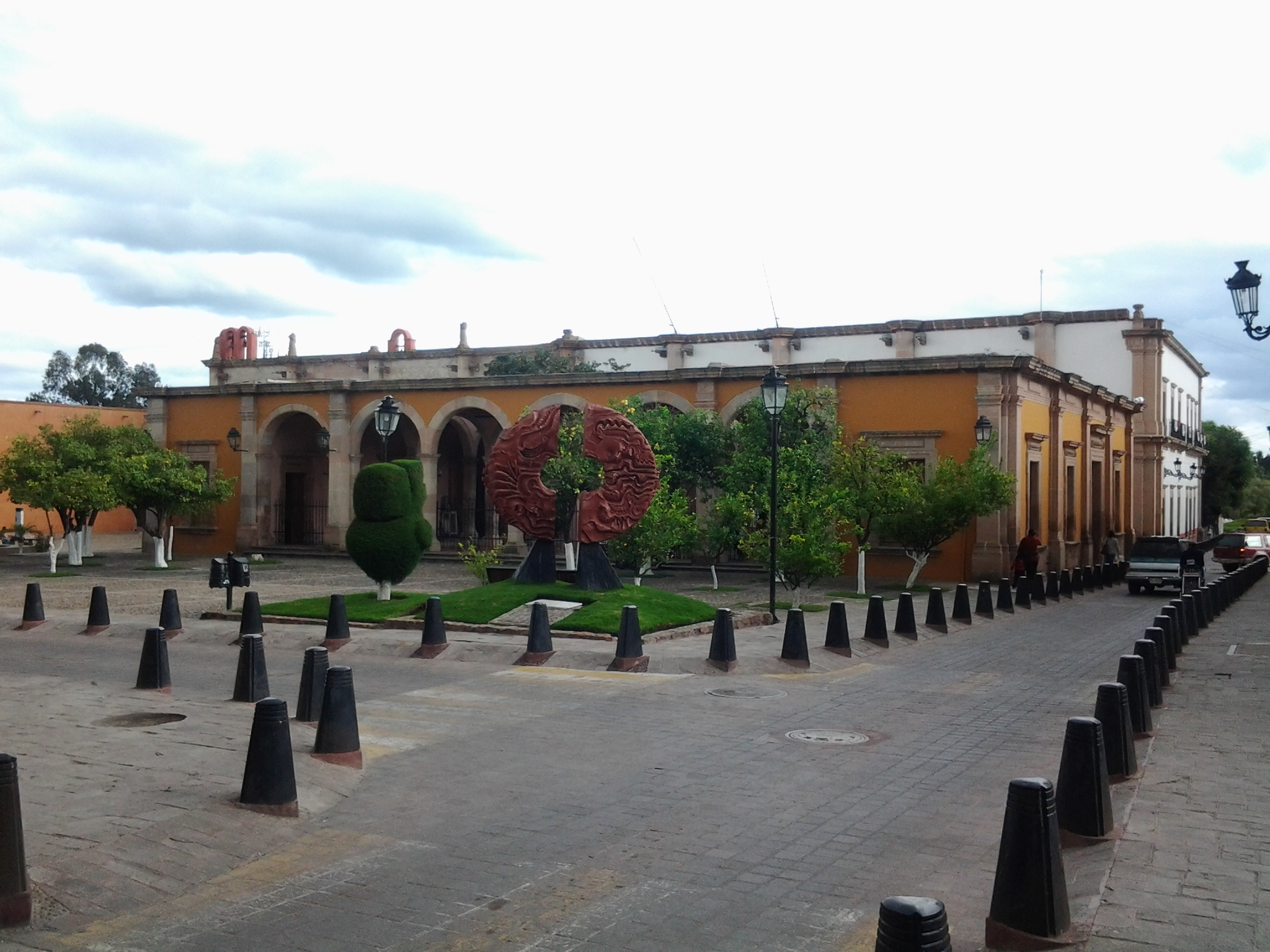
Miguel Leandro Guerra School of Arts and Trades

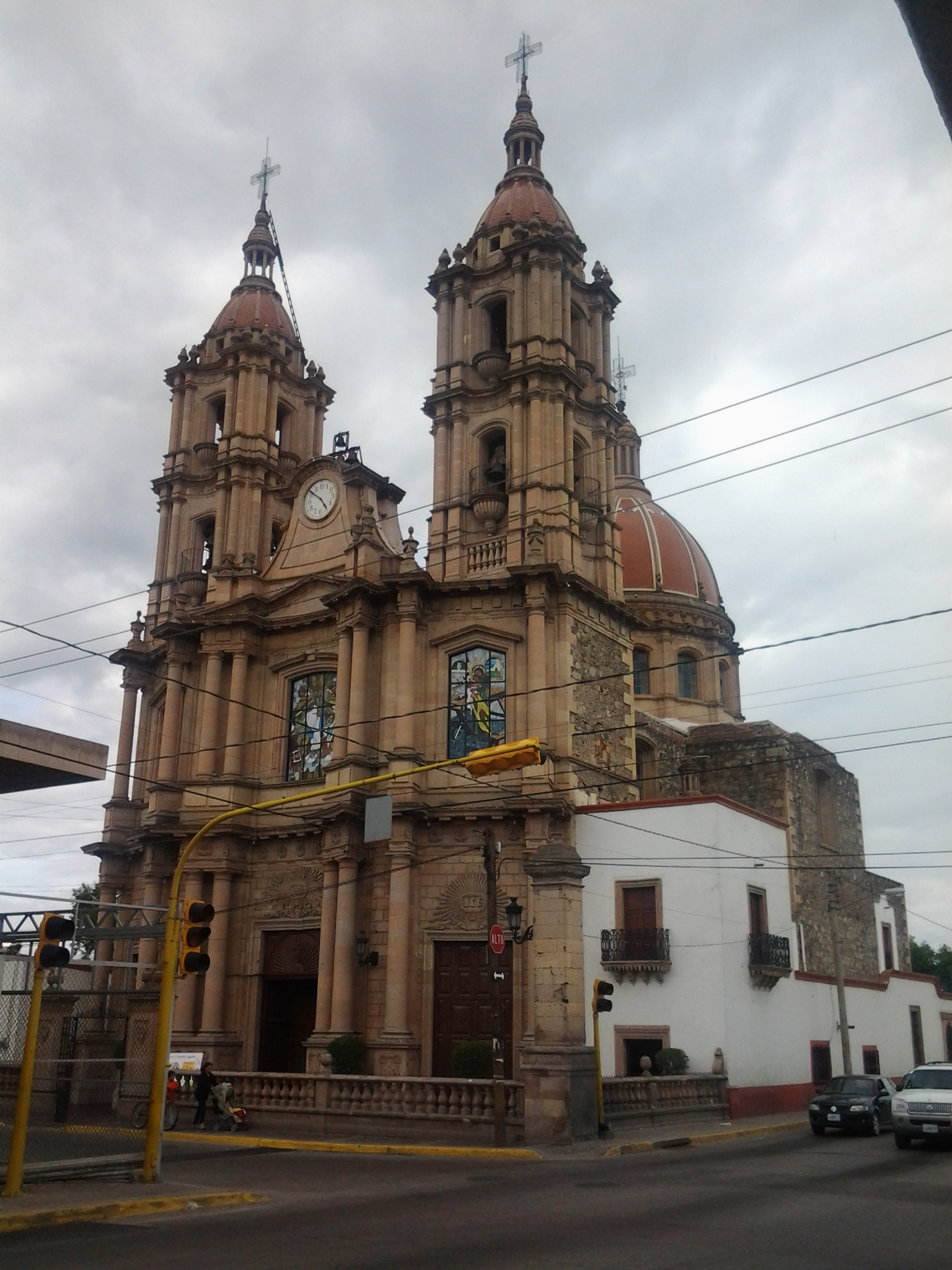
N. Sra. de la Luz Church

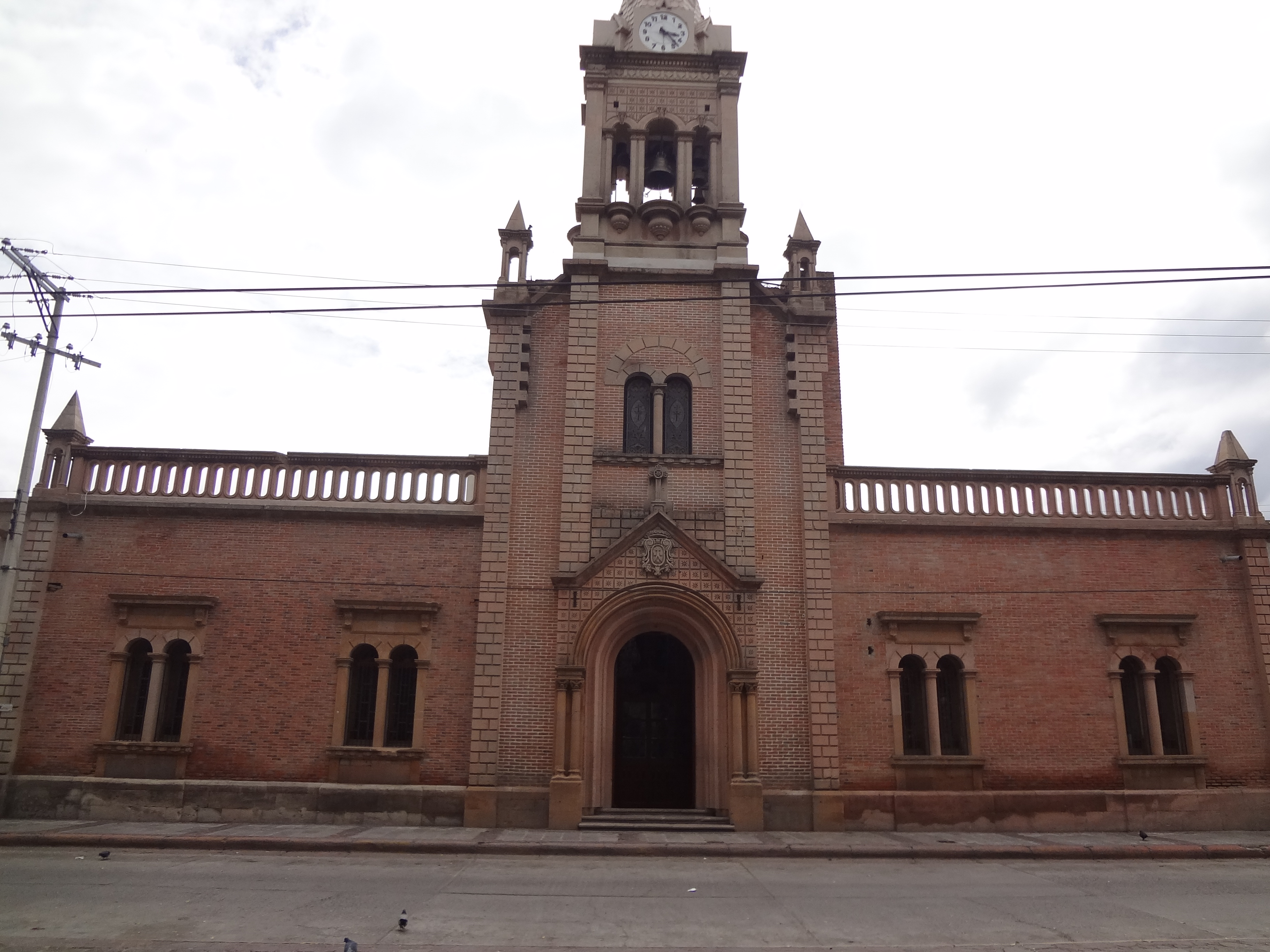
San Felipe de Jesús Temple

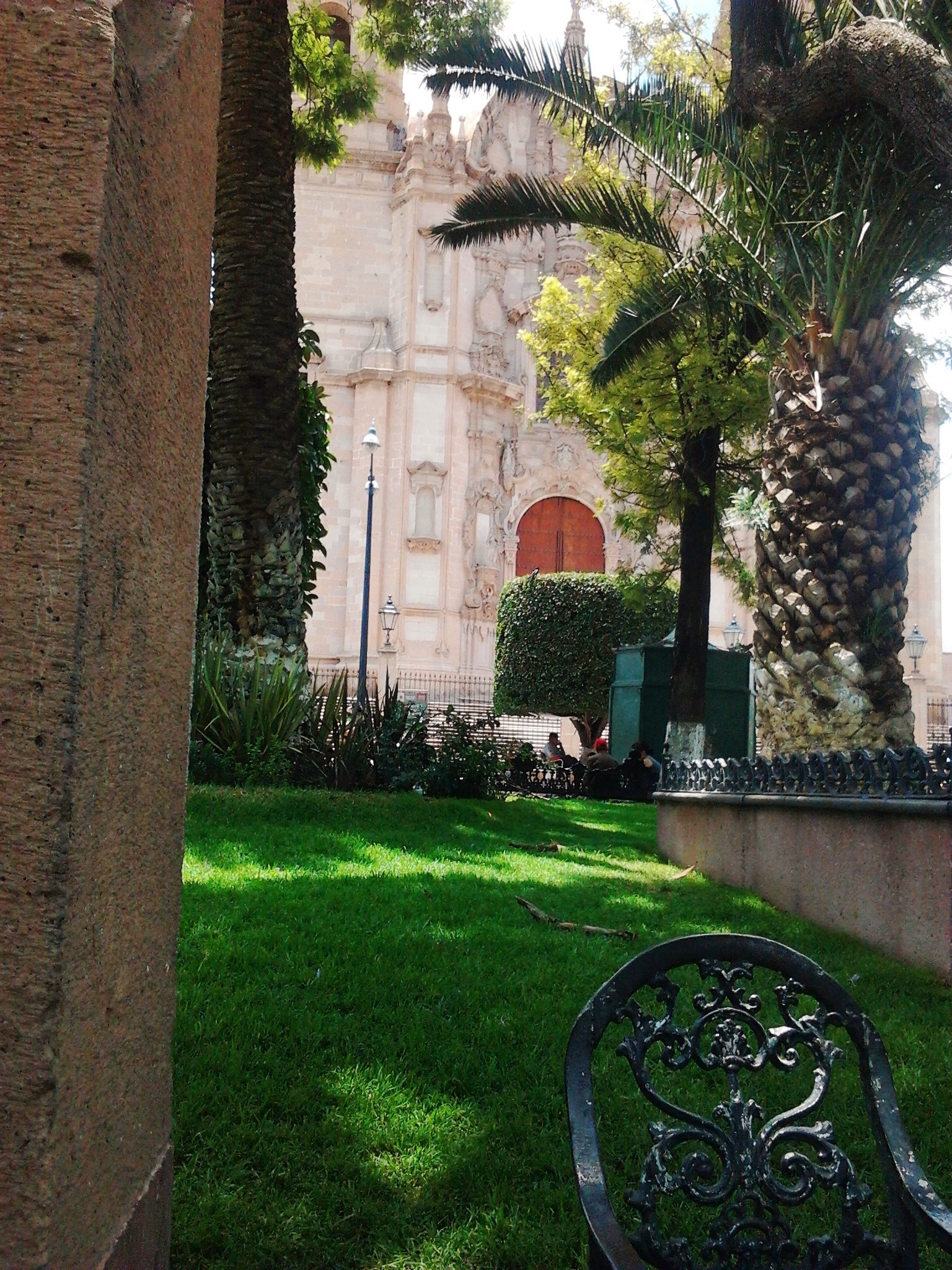
Asunción de María Park

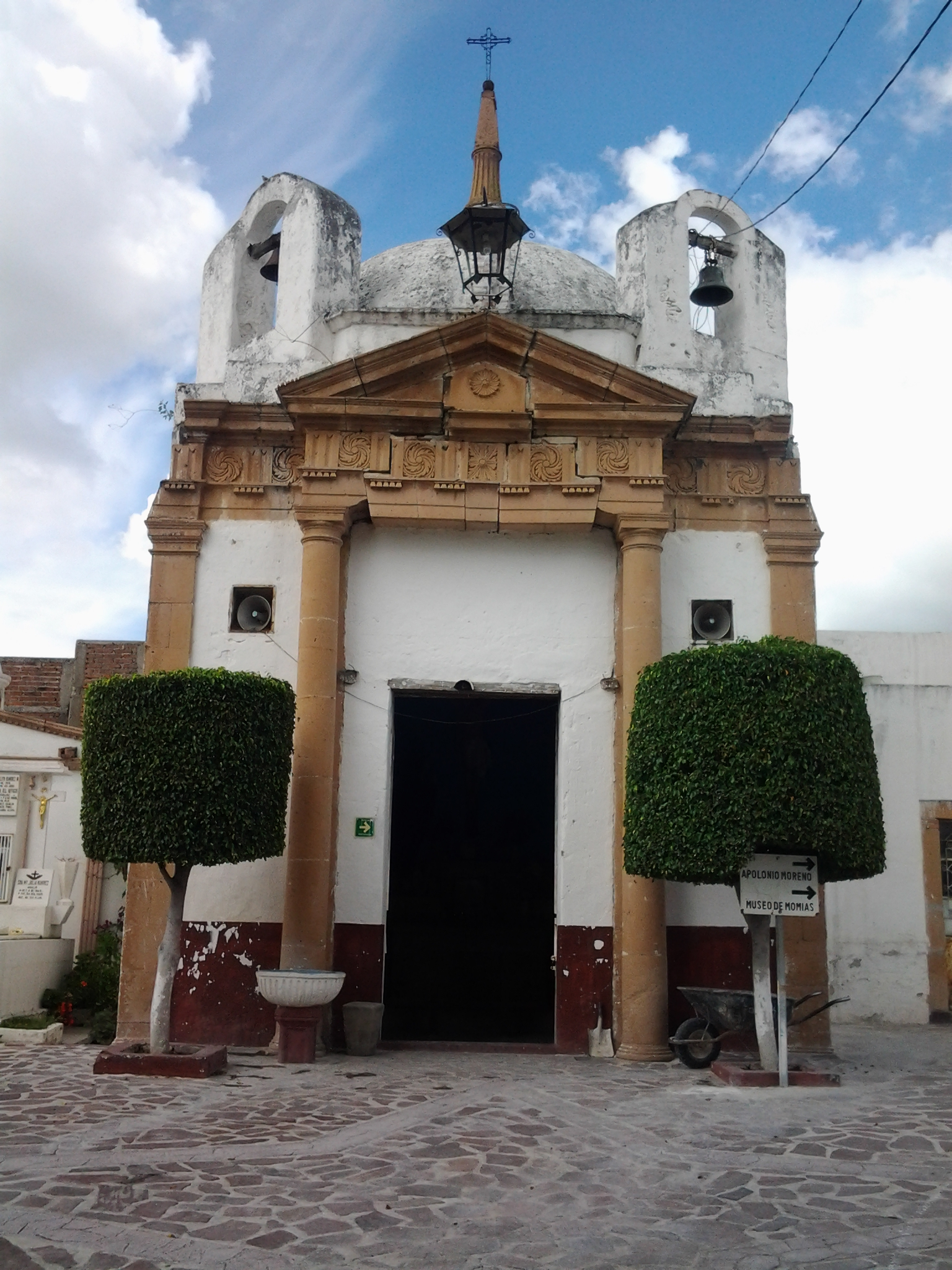
Panteon de la Soledad

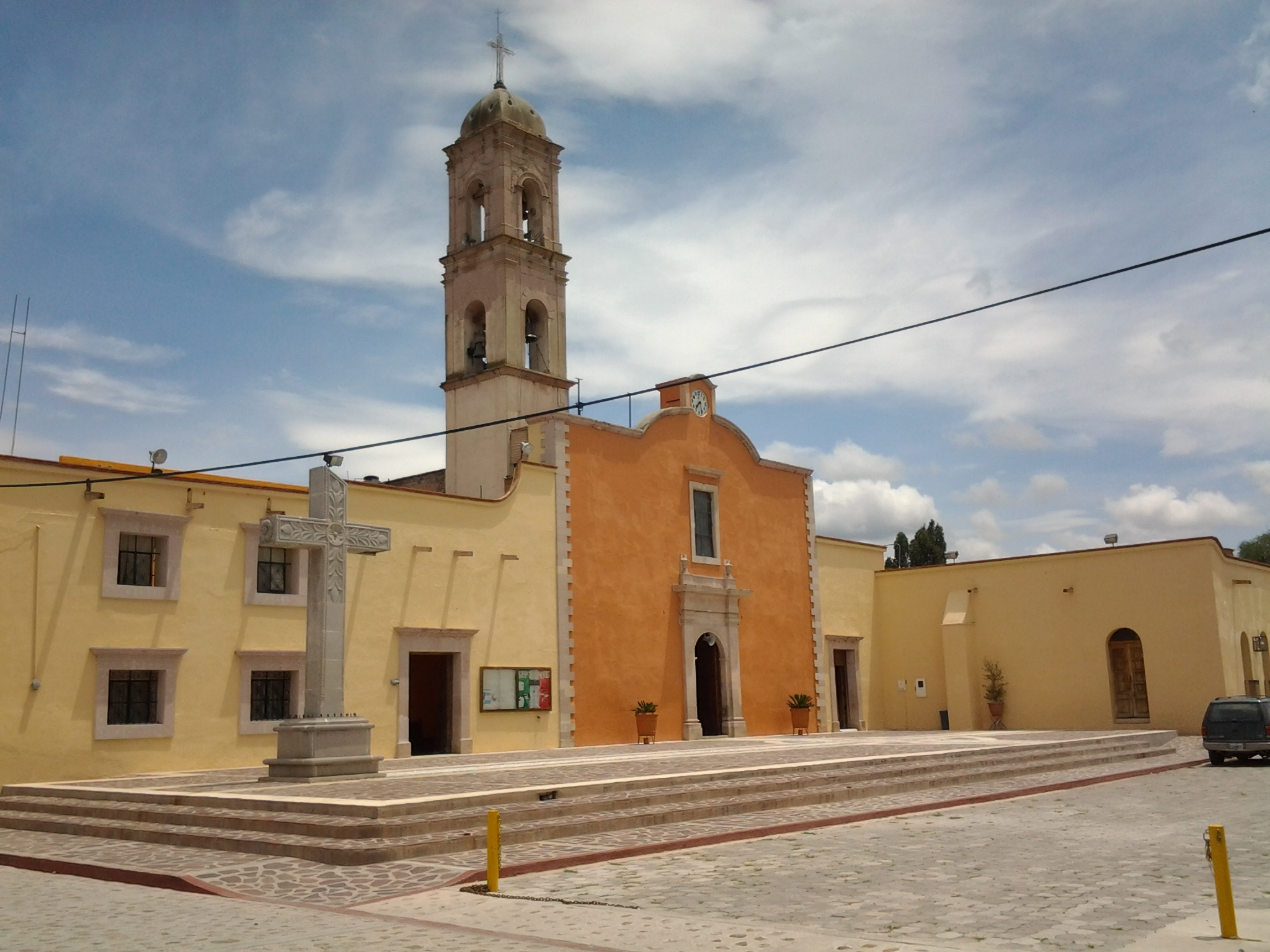
San Miguel Church

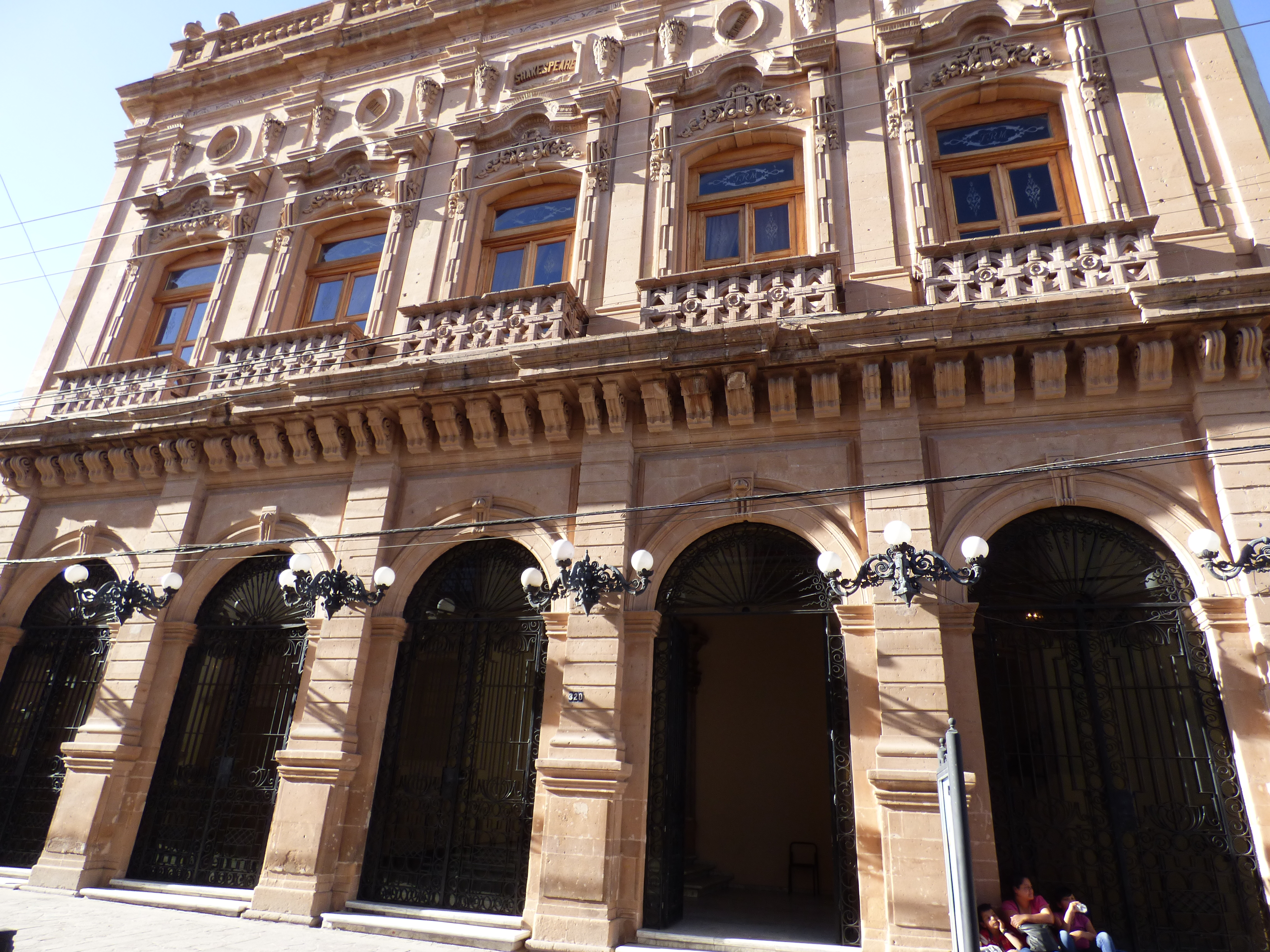
Teatro José Rosas Moreno

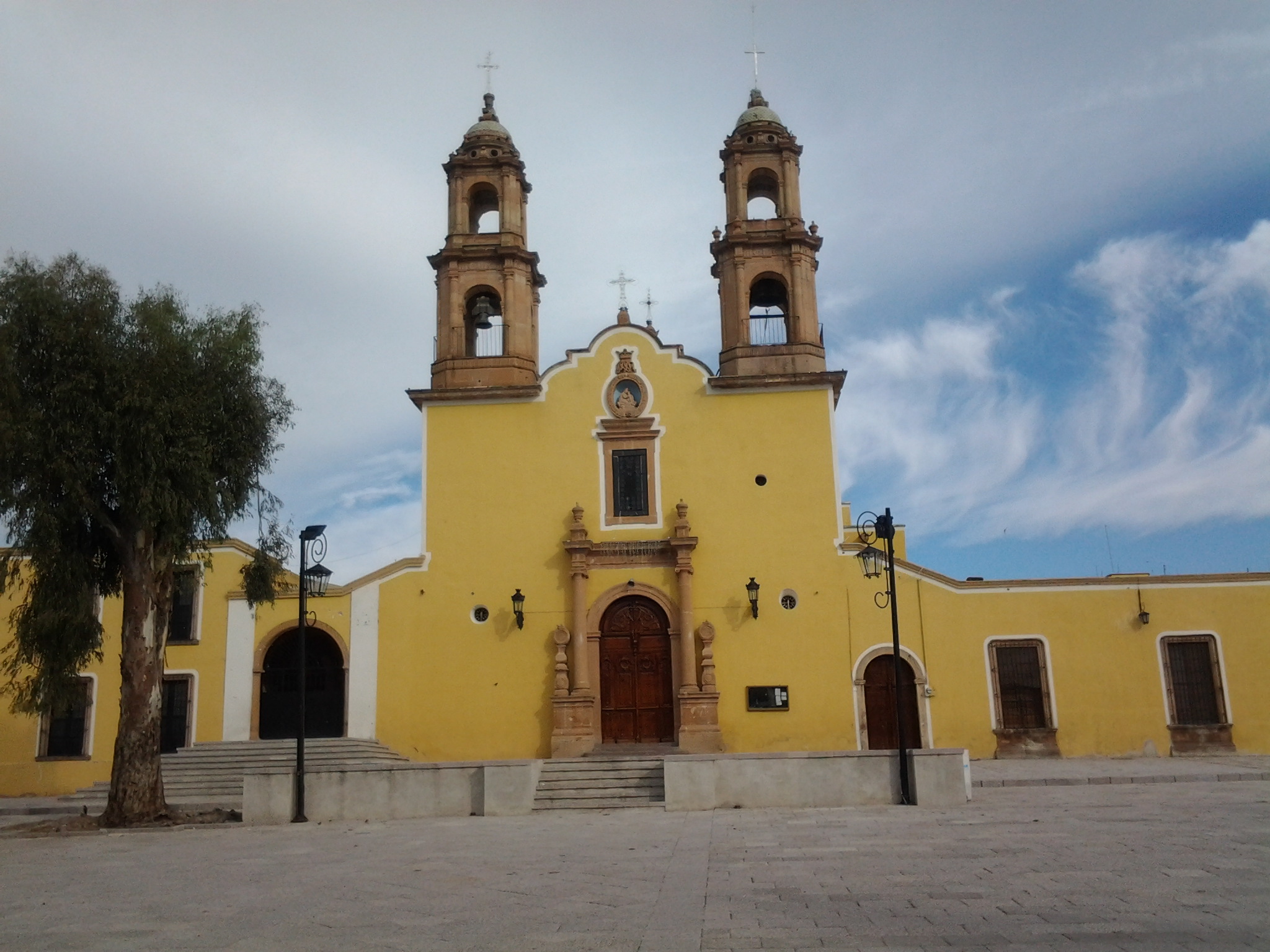
N. Sra. del Refugio Church

== Transportation ==
The city used to be served by the Francisco Primo de Verdad National Airport (IATA: LOM). The nearest airport, Del Bajio International Airport (IATA: BJX) is located near Silao, Guanajuato, an hour's drive away.
