= Ramón Muñoz Gutiérrez =

Mexican politician (born 1960)

Ramón Muñóz Gutiérrez (born 1960 in Lagos de Moreno, Jalisco) is a Mexican politician affiliated with the National Action Party (PAN).

== Political career ==
He served as a Senator in the LX and LXI Legislatures of the Congress of Mexico. Muñóz Gutiérrez studied psychology at the Universidad de Guanajuato and later worked for different companies including Grupo Bimbo. When Vicente Fox became Governor of Guanajuato Muñóz joined Fox's cabinet and became a close advisor, and later, when Fox took the presidential office in 2000 Muñóz was designated a member of the Mexican Executive Cabinet.

In 2006 the National Action Party (PAN) designated Muñóz as one of its candidates to the Senate of Mexico to serve during the LX and the LXI Legislatures of the Mexican Congress. He was elected senator via proportional representation.
