= Teocaltiche =

Teocaltiche Teocaltillitzin Tequaliche
- Municipality and Town
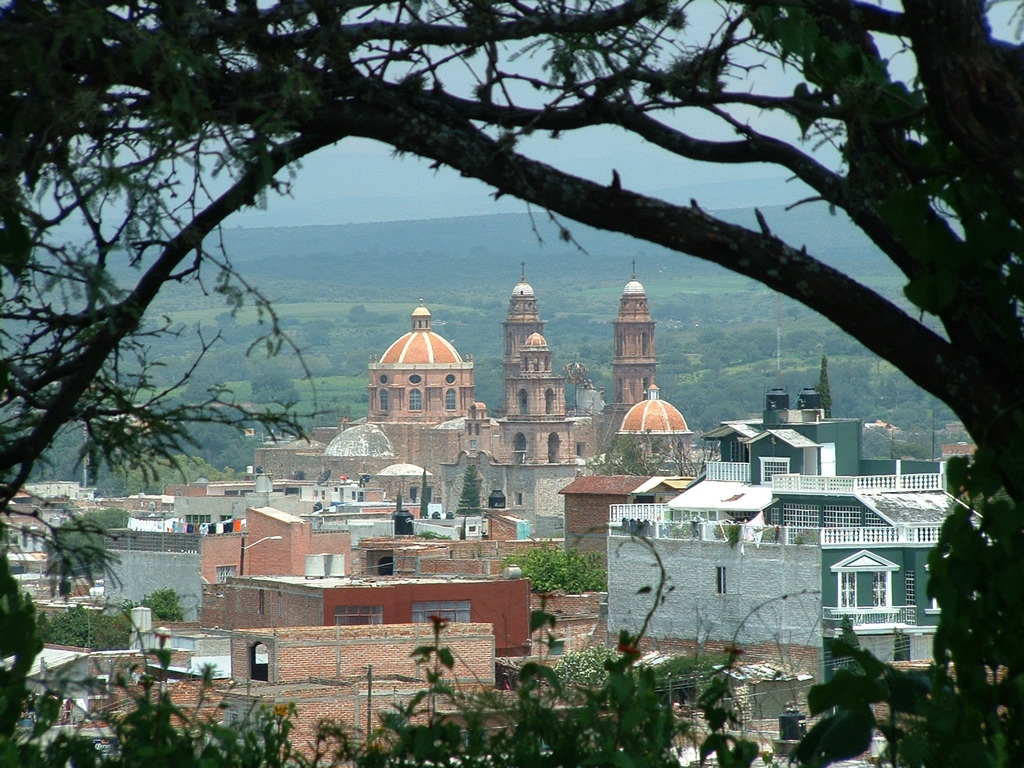

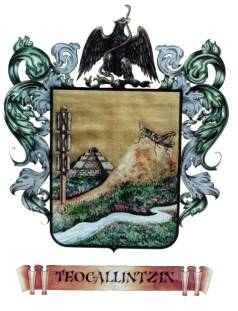
- Coat of arms
- Nickname: Teocal
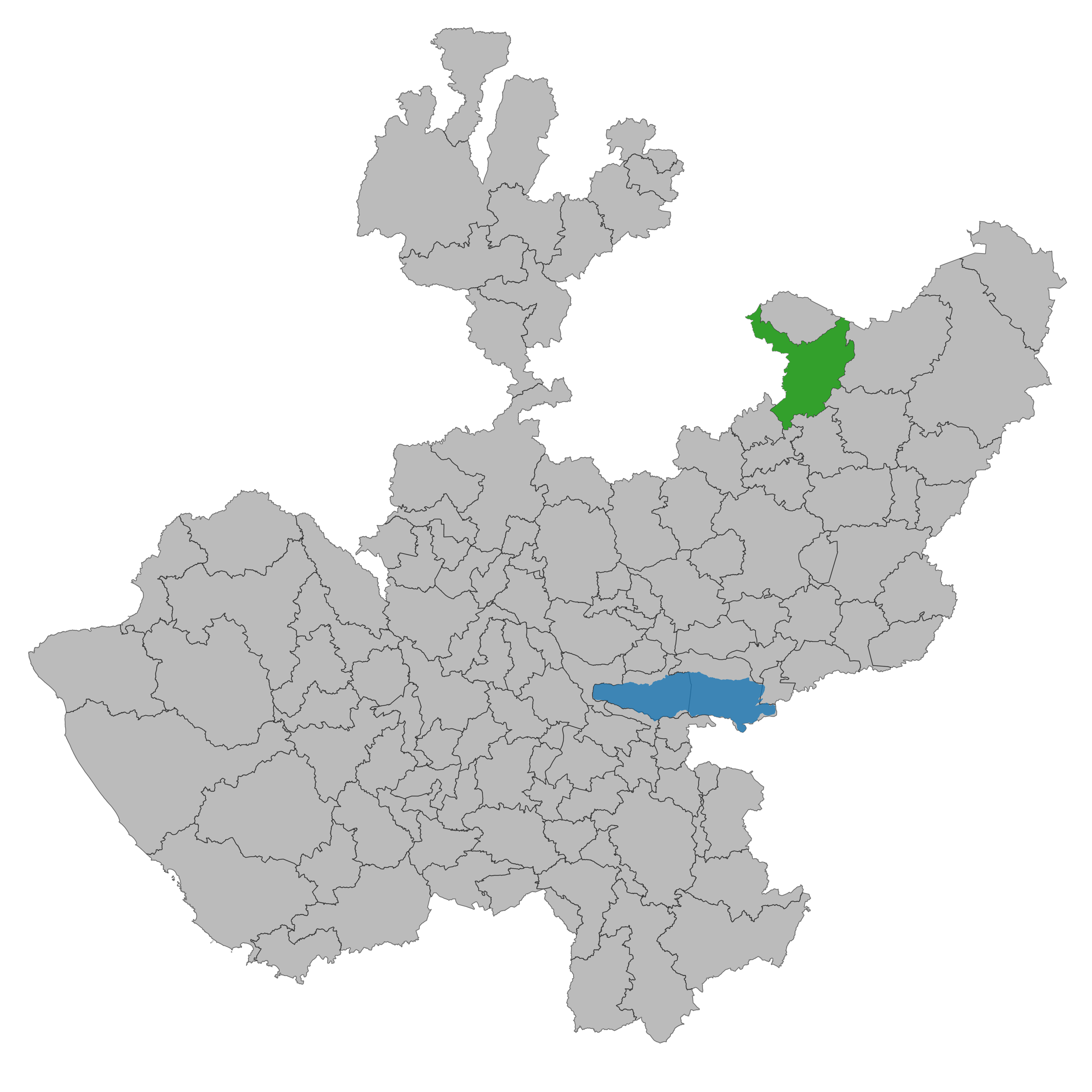
- Location of the municipality in Jalisco

- Location in Mexico Teocaltiche (Mexico)
- Coordinates: 21°15′N 102°23′W
- Country: Mexico
- State: Jalisco
- Municipality: Teocaltiche
- Settled: 1187
- Founded: 1530
- Incorporated (Municipality): November 22, 1869

Government
  - Type: Ayuntamiento
  - Municipal president: Juan Manuel Vallejo Pedroza; Morena

Area
  - Total: 933.5 km^{2} (360.4 sq mi)
  - Town: 6.21 km^{2} (2.40 sq mi)

Population (2020 census)
  - Total: 36,980
  - Density: 39.61/km^{2} (102.6/sq mi)
  - Town: 24,580
  - Town density: 3,960/km^{2} (10,300/sq mi)
- Demonym: Chapulin or Chapulines
- Time zone: UTC-6 (Central Standard Time)

Teocaltiche (Nahuatl languages: Teocaltillitzin "place near the temple") is a town and municipality in the central-western Mexican state of Jalisco.

== Notable people ==
- Ángel Alonzo, footballer
- José Guadalupe Cruz, comics writer and screenwriter
- Mario Díaz Pérez, Mexican football manager and former football player
- Hernando Martel, politician
