= San José de los Reynoso =

San José de los Reynoso, Jalisco México
- Town
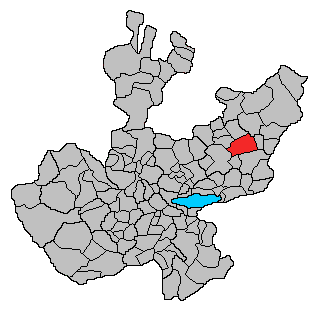
- Location of the town in Jalisco

- Location in Mexico
- Coordinates: 21°4′21″N 102°17′5″W
- Country: Mexico
- State: Jalisco
- Established: 1783

Population (2020 census)
  - Total: 1,080
- Time zone: UTC-6 (Central Standard Time)
  - Summer (DST): UTC-5 (Central Daylight Time)
- 47150: 47150

San José De Los Reynoso is a small town located in the northeast region of Los Altos, Jalisco, Mexico.

== History ==
San Jose de los Reynoso was founded in 1783 by Spanish settlers. Before the arrival of the conquistadores, Tecuexes lived in that area. The Tecuexes were defeated by the Spanish and then the first Spanish families of hidalgos began to settle in the area. The first three families to arrive in San Jose were the Reynoso family, the Lozas and the Muñoz. The name San Jose was chosen as an honor to Saint Joseph, since it was a Spanish occupied area consisting of devout Catholics. The second part of the name "Reynoso" was added because their family were the first Europeans to arrive, and the founders were also an illegitimate and lesser branch of the Reynoso family. The first church began construction in 1837 and was completed in 1887, as it was done in a small religious town this was viewed as important.

San Jose de los Reynoso is a delegation of the San Miguel El Alto municipality, in the region Altos South, Jalisco. This small colonial town is approximately 1800 meters (~1.12 miles) above sea level and enjoys a semi-dry weather. Located near the heart of the Altos region, San Jose is within close distance to the tequila region of Los Altos; of which the county of Arandas is the most important. Moreover, the town is approximately a 20-minute drive from San Juan de los Lagos; a city famous for its venerated Virgin of San Juan. Another important place near San Jose is the town of Santa Ana de Guadalupe; home of Saint Toribio Romo, canonized by Pope John Paul II.

San Jose de los Reynoso may have been involved in the Cristero War .

== Population ==
The population of the town as of 2020 was 1,080.

During the late 20th century, many of the town's inhabitants emigrated to other cities in Mexico and various regions of the United States, due mainly to economic hardship. This diaspora is concentrated in Aguascalientes, Mexico, as well as the state of California, and the cities of Chicago and Dallas in the United States. It is estimated that currently over half its population live outside of San José, with the largest concentration in the U.S. city of Chicago and its metropolitan area.
