= Victoriano Ramírez =

Mexican general

General Victoriano "El Catorce" Ramírez
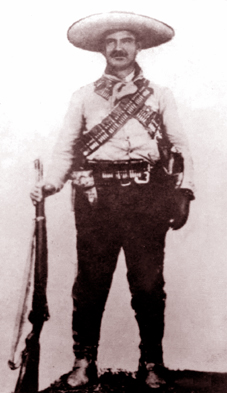
- Born: Victoriano Ramírez López; April 13, 1888; San Miguel El Alto, Jalisco, Mexico
- Died: March 17, 1929 (aged 40); Tepatitlan, Jalisco, Mexico
- Occupation: Cristero General
- Years active: 1927 – 1929
- Spouse: Dolores Gutiérrez

Victoriano Ramírez López (April 13, 1888 in San Miguel el Alto, Jalisco – March 17, 1929 in Tepatitlan, Jalisco), also known as "El Catorce" (The Fourteen), was a Mexican General of the Cristero War known for his excellent combat skills.

== Early life ==
Map of the southern half of Los Altos de Jalisco. San Miguel el Alto municipality, Ramírez's birthplace, is labeled with the number 8.

Victoriano Ramírez was born on April 13, 1888, at the Buena Vista ranch in the municipality of San Miguel el Alto, Jalisco, Mexico, to Carlos Ramírez and Viviana López. He had four siblings: sisters Francisca and Paulina and brothers Pedro and Vicente. As a child, Ramírez was very humble and smiled often.

Like many children living in the rural areas of Los Altos during the late 19th century, Ramírez never attended school. He never learned to read or write, but his parents taught him how to pray and basic life skills. Ramírez's father was a farmer, barely making enough money with which to sustain the family. Ramírez's mother tended to the household, caring for him and his siblings while educating them on matters such as behavior and the Catholic religion, where she instilled in them a disapproval of Protestants. Ramírez had his first Holy Communion when he was ten years old, almost certainly during the liturgical Easter season in the spring of 1898. During his teenage years, Ramírez was taught how to protect livestock and how to farm.

== Adulthood ==
=== In the United States ===
At the age of 20, Ramírez decided to head north to the United States in order to make more money. He probably arrived sometime in 1908, and he sent money and letters back to his parents in Jalisco. After a year and a half, Ramírez returned home. Shortly after, his mother, ill and weakened by her age and the absence of her son, died, predeceasing her husband and leaving behind her five grown children.

=== Alias ===
According to legend, when Ramírez escaped from a prison in San Miguel el Alto, Jalisco, where he was waiting for a murder trial after quarrel, a detachment of fourteen armed men went to look for him at a hill. Forced to fight against his pursuers, the fugitive hid among the crags of a ravine and after a long firefight killed all his opponents. When Ramírez was sure of his victory, he took the field and picked up the fourteen arms of his victims and sent them to the mayor of San Miguel el Alto with a message, advising him "not to send such few people." For this, Ramírez earned the name "El Catorce" (The Fourteen).

== Cristero War ==
=== Military success ===
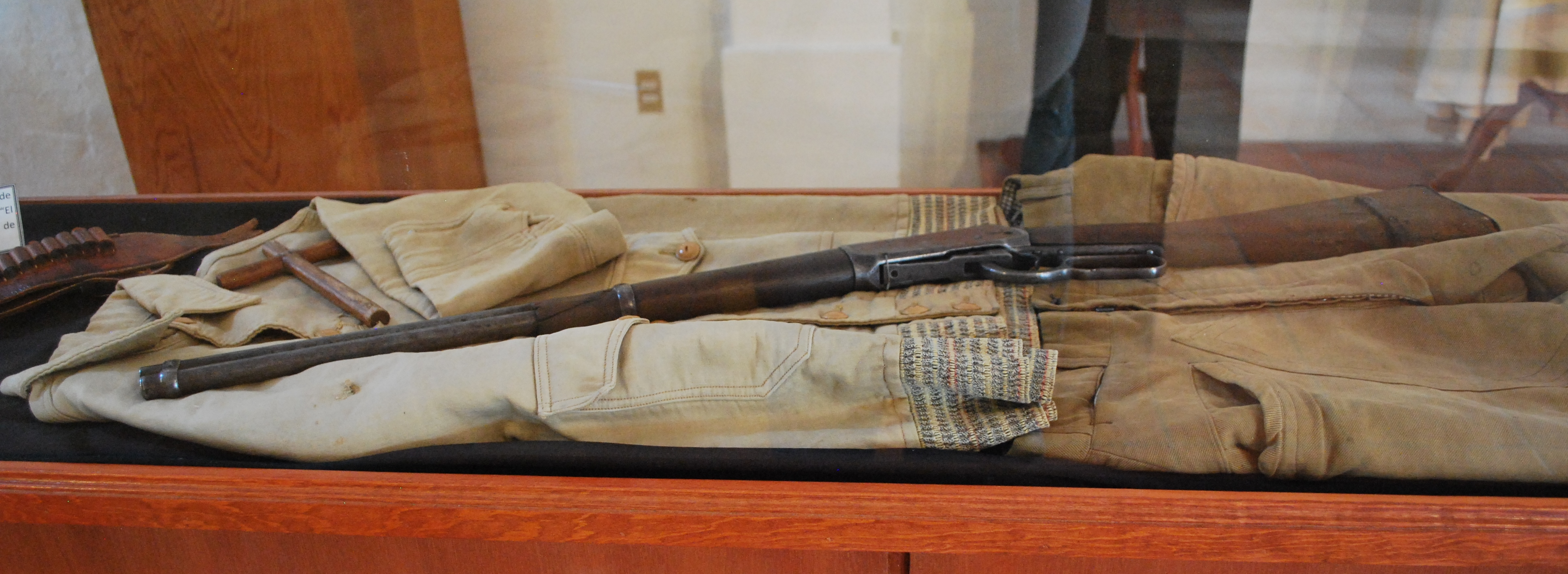
A set of clothing and a rifle, all of which belonged to Ramírez, on display in a museum in Encarnación de Diaz.

Ramírez was among the first to join the Cristero rebellion. He was one of the few Cristeros who did not desert the fight in May 1927. He commanded the "Fourteen Dragons" squadron, which was part of the San Julián regiment under the command of General Miguel Hernández. Ramírez's first acts as a Cristero were spoken of as legendary feats, and tradition states that when "Callistas" (federal troops) heard the cry of "Viva El Catorce!", it struck fear in their hearts during fighting. Additionally, Ramírez also had a reputation for superb accuracy.

On March 15, 1927, the Battle of San Julián began, and "El Catorce" had to resist a day of federal charges by General Espiridión Rodríguez before Hernández arrived the next day to support him. Eventually, the battle resulted in a Cristero victory, and the federal army suffered their worst defeat in the entire war.

=== Downfall ===
The difficulties that arose between Ramírez and his companions seemingly began with organizational reforms that General Enrique Gorostieta Velarde deemed necessary to establish between Cristero contingents. Ramírez, perhaps feeling that his authority was being undermined, put a number of obstacles to the proposed new organization. In view of his attitude, he was relieved of his duties, and was banned from having armed men, except for a small escort. Ramírez did not obey these orders, and as he was liked by the people of San Miguel el Alto, his armed escorts were increased. Father Aristeo Pedroza invited him to refocus on the Cristero struggle, but Ramírez refused. These refusals antagonized other Cristero leaders, and Father Aristeo Pedroza, Father Heriberto Navarrete, and Mario Valdés eventually pursued Ramírez with 300 men. By then, Ramírez was fortified at the top of El Carretero, along with 100 colleagues.

=== Death and burial ===
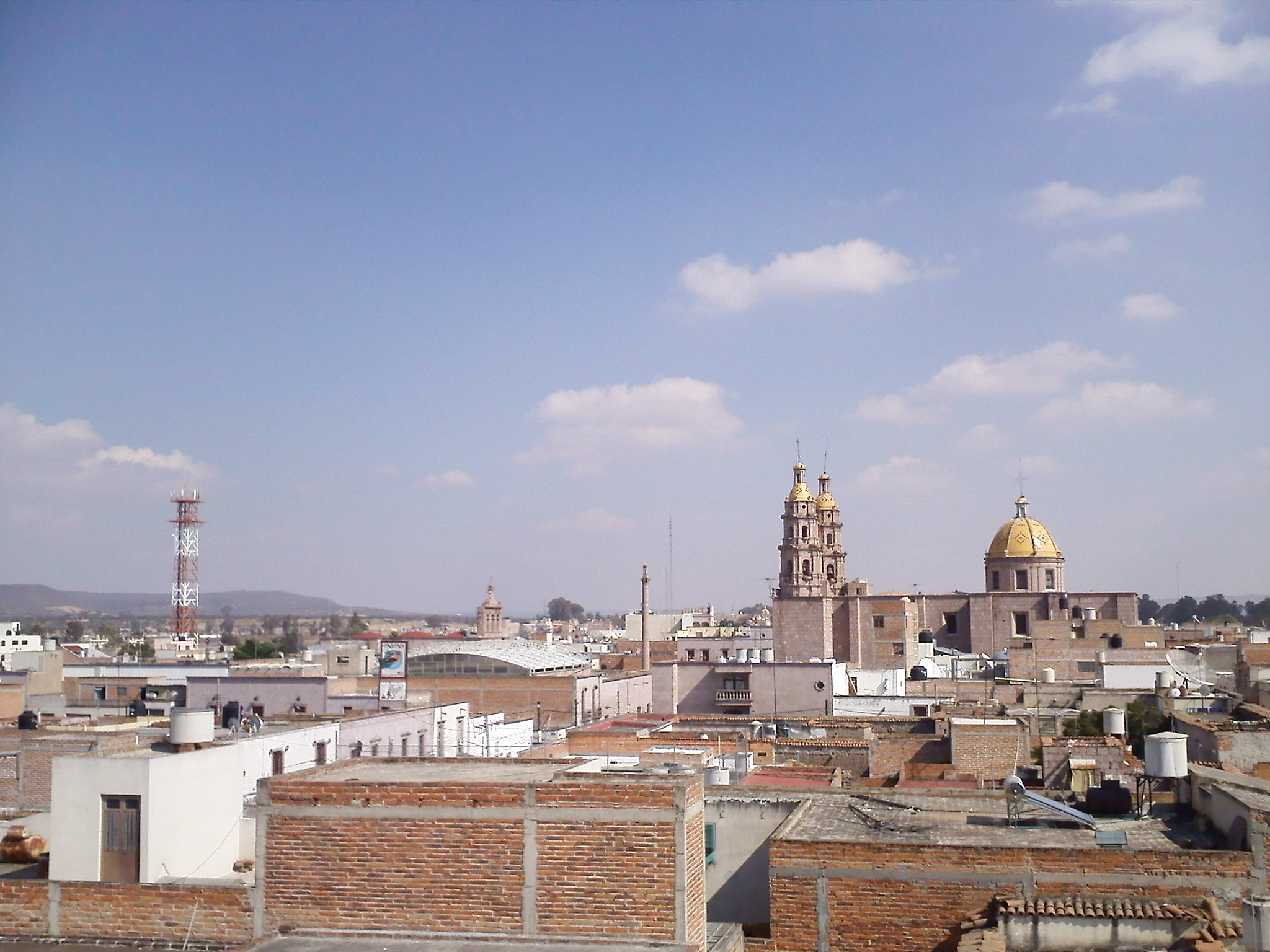
San Miguel el Alto, the town where Ramírez is buried.

Ramírez was eventually arrested and accused of embezzlement, insubordination, and resistance to higher orders. For these accusations, Pedroza ordered his execution, and to avoid commotions amongst the Cristeros, as El Catorce was highly esteemed, it was resolved immediately to fulfill the sentence. The details surrounding Ramírez's death are uncertain. One source states that, in order to avoid a popular uproar of the locals in Tepatitlan, Valdes had Ramírez stabbed to death discreetly. Another source states that at the time of his execution, he barricaded himself in his cell, so they had to break down the door with a battering ram to lead him to the place of execution. However, he jumped out with intentions of snatching the rifle of the nearest man, but was mortally wounded by a bullet to the chest.

== Personal life ==
Victoriano Ramírez married Dolores Gutiérrez, and the couple had a daughter, Natalia Ramírez Gutiérrez. Even though Ramírez was married, he was known to be unfaithful. Locals commented that it was easy to figure out in which ranches you could find "his women". Ramírez and Navarrete had a conversation, and it is said that the priest was struck by Ramírez's behavior and asked him the name of his legitimate wife, to which he replied, "Any woman is legitimate."

== Legacy ==
At hearing about Ramírez's death, the Mexican Army General Saturnino Cedillo said, "El Catorce was killed by his own comrades, idiots! They don't realize what they did. They cut the head of the snake, and left the tail to me." The death of "El Catorce" generated confrontations between General Miguel Hernández and General Enrique Gorostieta Velarde as well as an extremely negative reaction from the local population, which had held Ramirez with high regard.

=== In popular culture ===
El Catorce was portrayed by actor Oscar Isaac in the film Cristiada (also titled For Greater Glory), an epic historical drama also starring Andy Garcia, Eva Longoria, Eduardo Verástegui, and Peter O'Toole. In the film El Catorce meets a much more heroic end.
