= Pedro Esqueda Ramírez =

Mexican Catholic priest, martyr and saint (1887–1927)

Saint Pedro Esqueda Ramirez
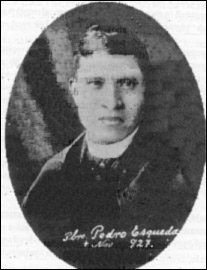

Priest
- Born: 29 April 1887; San Juan de los Lagos, Jalisco, Mexico
- Died: 22 November 1927 (aged 40); Teocaltitan de Guadalupe, Jalisco, Mexico
- Venerated in: Roman Catholic Church
- Canonized: 21 May 2000
- Feast: 22 November

Pedro Esqueda Ramírez (20 April 1887 – 22 November 1927) was a Mexican Catholic priest and martyr. He was canonized by John Paul II on 21 May 2000.

== Biography ==
Born in San Juan de los Lagos, he entered the seminary in Guadalajara at the age of fifteen, being ordained a priest in 1916. He was appointed vicar of San Juan de los Lagos.

As a result of the Cristero War, Esqueda continued to celebrate Mass secretly, which is why he was apprehended and tortured by the Mexican Army and shot on 22 November 1927 in the vicinity of Teocaltitán, in Jalisco.

His remains are in the presbytery of the Cathedral Basilica of San Juan de los Lagos.

He was canonized by John Paul II on 21 May 2000, along with twenty-six other Mexican religious and lay people, many of them victims of the religious persecution unleashed in Mexico during the Cristero War (1926–1929).
