= Basilica of the National Shrine of Our Lady of San Juan del Valle =

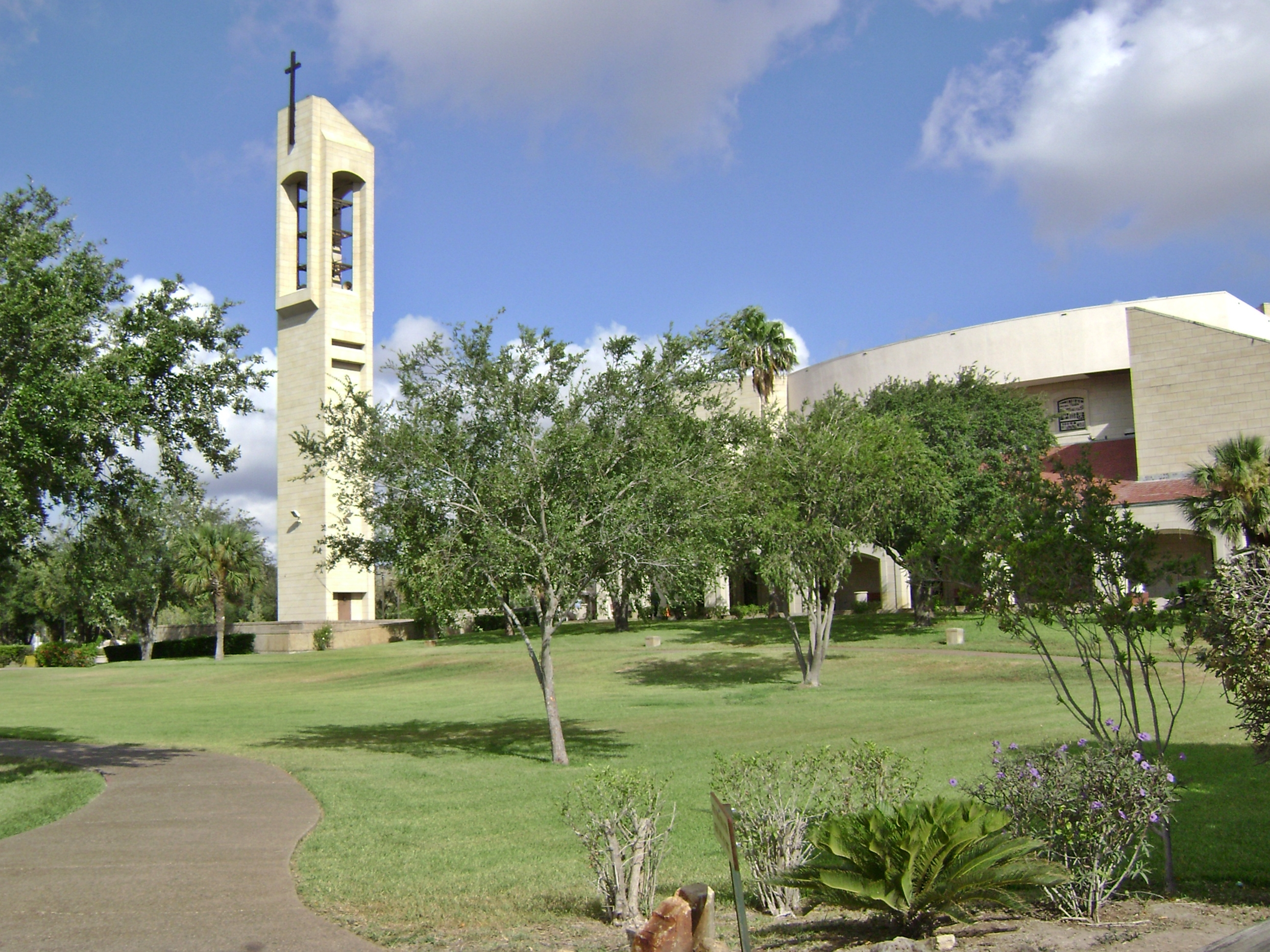

- Location in Texas
- 26°11′55″N 98°09′27″W
- Location: 400 N. San Antonio Ave. San Juan, Texas
- Country: United States
- Denomination: Roman Catholic Church
- Website: www.olsjbasilica.org

History
- Founded: 1954
- Founder(s): Rev. Jose Maria Azpiazu, O.M.I.
- Dedicated: April 19, 1980

Architecture
- Groundbreaking: November 27, 1976
- Completed: 1980

Specifications
- Capacity: 1,800

Administration
- Diocese: Brownsville

Clergy
- Bishop: Most Rev. Daniel E. Flores
- Rector: Rev. Jorge Gomez

The Basilica of the National Shrine of Our Lady of San Juan del Valle is a minor basilica of the Catholic Church located in San Juan, Texas, United States. It is also a national shrine under the direction of the Diocese of Brownsville.

== History ==
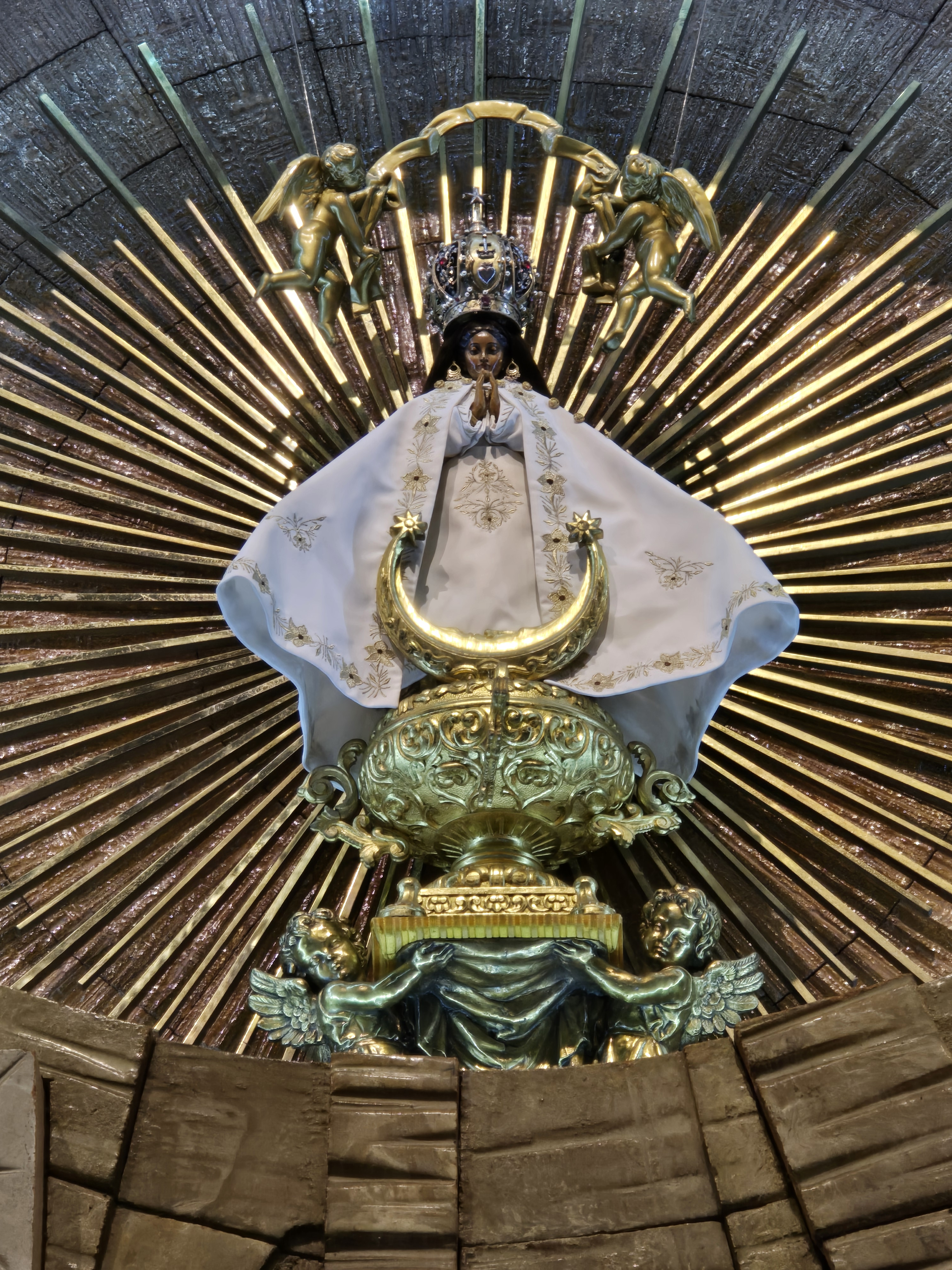
Our Lady of San Juan del Valle

The Rev. Jose Maria Azpiazu, O.M.I., pastor of the parish of St. John the Baptist in San Juan, began fostering a devotion to Our Lady of San Juan de los Lagos after he was made pastor in 1949. He commissioned an artist in Guadalajara, Mexico, to reproduce the statue of the Virgin that was venerated at San Juan de los Lagos. He placed the completed statue in the San Juan chapel.

Upon the approval of Bishop Mariano S. Garriaga of Corpus Christi a new church and shrine dedicated to the Virgin of San Juan were built in 1954. On October 23, 1970, a low-flying airplane crashed into the shrine and exploded into flames. The shrine was destroyed with the exception of the tower, which still stands to the south of the new shrine. Although there were people in the shrine, the pilot of the plane, Francis B. Alexander, was the only one killed. The loss was estimated at $1.5 million ($6.7M today). The Rev. Patricio Dominguez, O.M.I., and the sacristan Pedro Rodriguez rescued the statue of Our Lady of San Juan del Valle. A diocesan priest, the Rev. Ron Anderson, saved the Blessed Sacrament from the fire. The shrine's dining room became the temporary home for the statue.

Brownsville Bishop John J. Fitzpatrick separated the shrine from the parish. Plans were made to build a parish church on the site of the former shrine and build a larger shrine church on the same property just to the north. The ground breaking for the new shrine was held on November 27, 1976. Cardinal Humberto Medeiros of Boston was present for the dedication along with Bishop Fitzpatrick and an estimated crowd of 50,000 people on April 19, 1980. Outdoor Stations of the Cross made up of 30 life size bronze statues were placed along a 3/4 mile path and were dedicated on October 16, 1993. The mural, Jesus Presents his Mother, on the shrine's exterior wall was blessed on February 2, 1995. The shrine itself was designated a national shrine by the National Conference of Catholic Bishops on March 24, 1998. Pope John Paul II designated the shrine as a minor basilica on June 12, 1999.

The most busy days for the Basilica are Saturdays and Sundays when the church sees the highest number of pilgrims. The mass time are as follows for the weekend. Saturday 11:30 and 5:30 pm. Sunday 7:00 AM-SPANISH, 9:00 AM-ENGLISH, 10:30 AM-BILINGUAL, 12 Noon-SPANISH, 1:30 PM-SPANISH, 3:00 AM-ENGLISH, 7:00 PM-SPANISH.

== See also ==
- Our Lady of San Juan de los Lagos
- Cathedral Basilica of San Juan de los Lagos
