= Battle of San Julián =

Battle of the Cristero War

- Part of the Cristero War
Date	15 March 1927
Location	San Julián, Jalisco, Mexico 21°1′N 102°10′W
Result	Cristero victory

Belligerents
Federal government	Cristeros

Commanders and leaders
Espiridión Rodríguez	Victoriano Ramírez; José Reyes Vega; Miguel Hernández

The Battle of San Julián was a military engagement fought on 15 March 1927 between forces of the Mexican federal government and Cristero rebels as a part of the Cristero War. The battle is considered to be the greatest military defeat of the Mexican government in the entire war.

== Background ==
The Cristero War began in 1926 when Mexican Catholics took up arms against the Mexican federal government of President Plutarco Elías Calles to protect the Catholic Church from his anti-clerical laws and reforms. Those who took up arms against the government were known as the National League for the Defense of Religious Liberty, but they were commonly known as simply "Cristeros."

== Battle ==
Mexican federal forces of the 78th Regiment under General Espiridión Rodríguez Escobar arrived at San Julián on 15 March 1927. Cristero forces under Victoriano Ramírez and José Reyes Vega put up a defense of San Julián, but the federal forces were superior and were overwhelming the Cristeros inflicting heavy casualties. During the battle, federal forces looted homes, raped women, and tortured two Cristero prisoners to death.

More federal forces arrived to support Rodríguez Escobar at around four in the afternoon, but around the same time, the federal forces saw Cristero reinforcements under General Miguel Hernández arriving but misidentified them as Joaquín Amaro Domínguez, the Mexican War and Navy Secretariat. Hernández had his men attack the federal forces in three columns, one from the south and west, one from the east and north, and the last from the southeast which he personally commanded. With Hernández's advance, most of the federal soldiers fled while some remained and tried to disguise themselves as locals and the battle ended in a Cristero victory.

== Aftermath ==
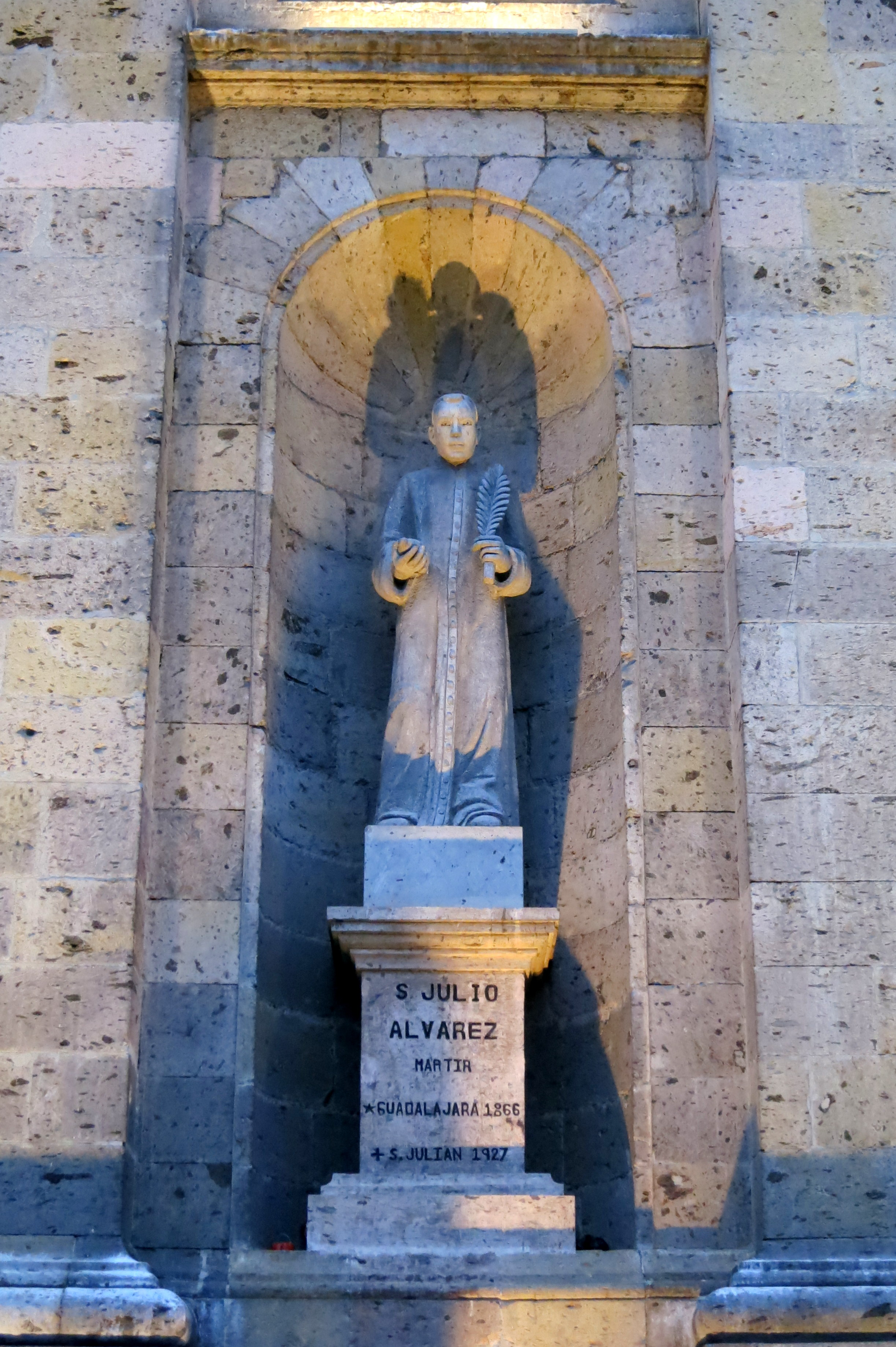
A statue of Julio Álvarez Mendoza adorning the exterior of the Guadalajara Cathedral

The Cristeros executed an unspecified number of federal prisoners on 19 March 1927 under the orders of Hernández. Exact casualty figures are unknown, but civilian and Cristero casualties were high. The battle was the greatest military defeat of the Mexican federal government during the entire war and was an embarrassment to Rodríguez Escobar and Calles' government.

The defeat made Calles recognize the Cristeros as a genuine threat to his government. On 26 March 1927, Amaro Domínguez marched soldiers to San Julián and had Julio Álvarez Mendoza, a Catholic priest, arrested and later executed on 30 March 1927 in retaliation for the defeat at San Julián. Álvarez Mendoza was later canonized as a saint by Pope John Paul II on 21 May 2000.

== In popular culture ==
A corrido, a Mexican form of narrative song, called "Corrido de los combates de San Julián" ("Corrido of the Combatants of San Julián") was written about the battle in 2002 by singers Evaristo Soto Cruz and Alfredo Soto Alcalá.

== Bibliography ==
- Castillo, Agustín (11 April 2017). "La Cristiada, los niños de la guerra" [The Cristiada, the Children of the War]. Milenio.com (in Spanish).
- Garcia, Gerardo P. (31 October 2017). "Victoriano Ramírez "El Catorce" Comandante Cristero" [Victoriano Ramírez "The Fourteen" Cristero Commander]. TravelLeon.net (in Spanish). León, Guanajuato.
- Hernández Hurtado, Juan Francisco (2003). "Capítulo XVII. Combate en San Julián" [Chapter XVII. Combat in San Julián]. ¡Tierra de Cristeros! Historia de Victoriano Ramírez y de la revolución cristera en los altos de Jalisco [Land of Cristeros! History of Victoriano Ramírez and of the Cristero Revolution in the Heights of Jalisco] (in Spanish). Mexico: Centro de estudios mexicanos y centroamericanos, Educación y Cultura Sanmiguelense. pp. 82–91. doi:10.4000/books.cemca.2981. ISBN 9789686029772.
- Redacción (28 April 2017). "San Julián derrama la primera sangre cristera" [Saint Julian Sheds the First Cristero Blood]. Liderempresarial.com (in Spanish).
- Young, Julia G. (2012). "Cristero Diaspora: Mexican Immigrants, the U.S. Catholic Church, and Mexico's Cristero War, 1926–29". The Catholic Historical Review. 98 (2). Catholic University of America Press: 271–300. doi:10.1353/cat.2012.0149. JSTOR 23240138. S2CID 154431224.
