= San Juan de los Lagos =

- Municipality and City
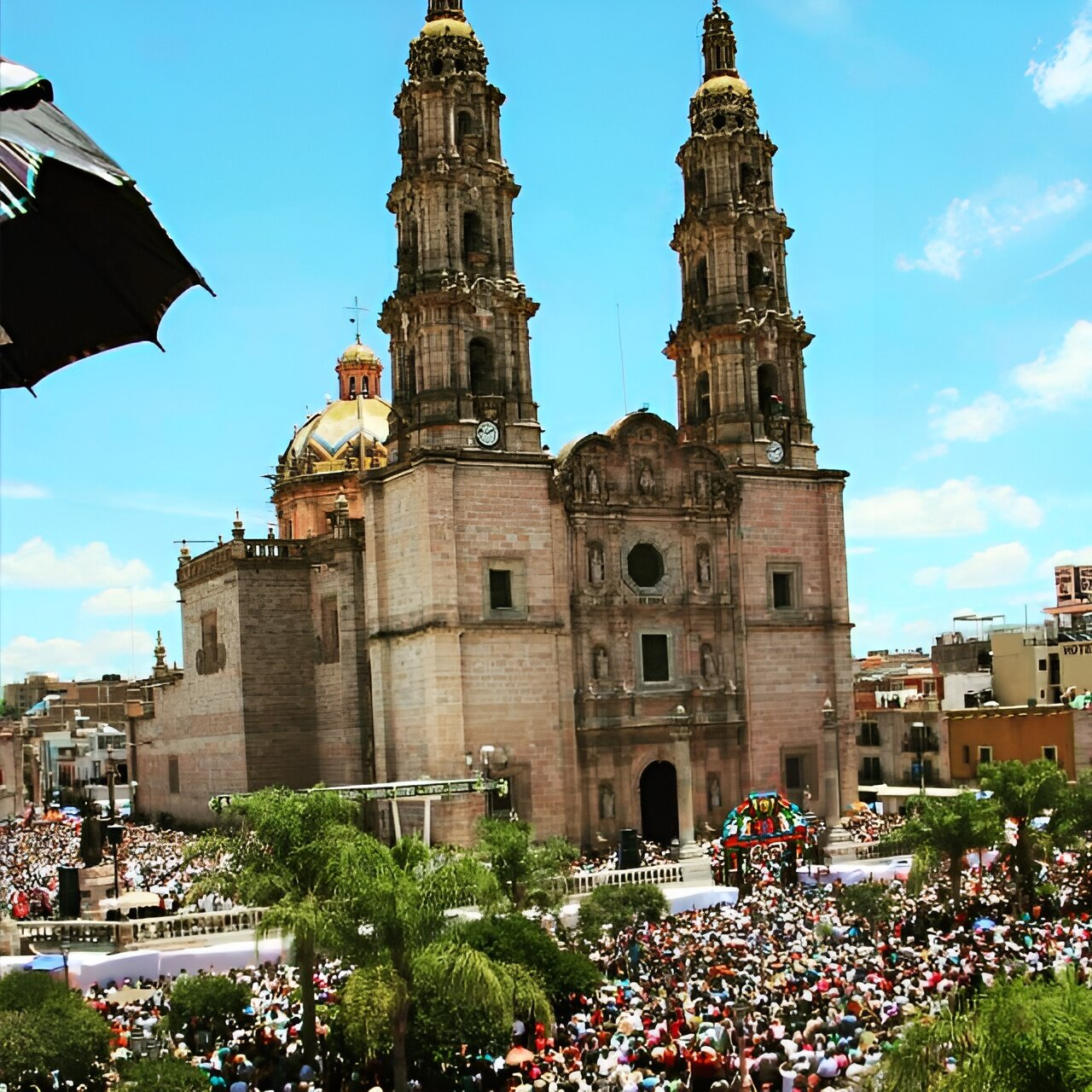
- Basilica of San Juan de los Lagos

- Coat of arms
- Nickname: San Juan
- Motto: Bienvenidos Peregrinos de Paz
- Location in Mexico, Guadalajara, Jalisco San Juan de los Lagos (Mexico)
- Coordinates: 21°14′45″N 102°19′51″W
- Country: Mexico
- State: Jalisco

Government
  - Municipal president: Alejandro C. de Anda Lozano; National Action Party

Area
  - Municipality: 847.7 km^{2} (327.3 sq mi)
  - City: 11.77 km^{2} (4.54 sq mi)

Population (2020 census)
  - Municipality: 72,230
  - Density: 85.21/km^{2} (220.7/sq mi)
  - City: 53,539
  - City density: 4,549/km^{2} (11,780/sq mi)
- Time zone: UTC−6 (Central Standard Time)
- Website: www.sanjuandeloslagos.gob.mx

San Juan de los Lagos (English: Saint John of the Lakes) is a city and municipality located in the northeast corner of the state of Jalisco, Mexico, in a region known as Los Altos. It is best known as the home of a small image of the Virgin Mary called Our Lady of San Juan de los Lagos (Nahuatl: Cihuapilli, lit. "Great Lady"). Miracles have been ascribed to her since 1632 and have made the Basilica of San Juan de los Lagos a major tourist attraction. The economy of the city is still heavily dependent on the flow of pilgrims to the shrine, which has amounted to between seven and nine million visitors per year.

== History ==
=== Pre-Hispanic era ===
For much of the pre-Hispanic period, the Altos area was inhabited by groups of Tecuexes and Nahuas who formed small independent states in the 12th century. Soon after, these dominions would fall under the rule of a single Tecuexe state, with its capital at Metzquititlán.

=== Establishment and early years ===
The first Spanish conquistador in the area was Pedro Almíndez Chirino, sent from Cuitzeo by Nuño Beltrán de Guzmán. The region was placed firmly into Spanish control by Cristóbal de Oñate after he conquered the nearby Caxcanes in Teocaltiche. Subsequently, the Mixtón Rebellion in the nearby Guadalajara area prompted measures to populate and fortify the Altos region under the supervision of the Franciscans. In 1542, the indigenous population of San Gaspar village was sent to the area, founding a new village called San Juan Bautista de Mezquititlán.

However, by the end of the 16th century, the town was still little more than a group of small houses along with a small hermitage. The hermitage, built by Friar Miguel de Bolonia, was dedicated to the Immaculate Conception. This structure was the first home of a very small image of the Virgin Mary, believed to have been brought to the area from Michoacán either by Bolonia or by Friar Antonio de Segovia. Over time, moths damaged the statue and it was packed away in a corner of the sacristy. The image remained there until 1632, when it became associated with its first miracle. After this, the image was taken to Guadalajara to be restored, and it was then returned to San Juan. Pilgrimages to the miraculous image soon began, and pilgrims' valuable offerings permitted the building of newer and grander churches for the image. The first chapel to the image was built in 1638; it is now the Chapel of the First Miracle.

Up until the events of 1623, San Juan Bautista had been a mainly indigenous community. Later, colonial authorities decided to "hispanicize" the Altos region, bringing in a large number of Spaniards and mestizos from neighboring parts, mostly through land grants. Many of these new residents came from the nearby town of Santa María de los Lagos, now known as Lagos de Moreno, and this prompted the changing of San Juan Bautista's name to San Juan de los Lagos. Shortly after this influx of newcomers, the number of indigenous in the city dropped to less than one quarter.

=== Growth and development ===
During the colonial era, the San Juan's importance grew as a pilgrimage center because of the miracles ascribed to the local image of the Virgin Mary. This influx of pilgrims provided a stream of potential customers, spurring the city's development as a regional economic center. An annual fair was established to coincided with the busiest pilgrimage season, the time around Candlemas. The economic impact of pilgrims on the city became evident relatively early in the colonial period.

San Juan had a number of advantages which contributed to its growing importance during the colonial period. First, there was a relative dearth of native pilgrimage sites in northern Mexico, as most sites are churches dedicated to Virgin and Christ images physically located in other parts of the country. The Virgin at San Juan, along with the one in Zapopan, were considered "frontier Virgins." Another important factor is that San Juan lies on the border between northern and central Mexico in an area now known as the Los Altos de Jalisco region and as such was an area frequently traveled through. At the town, a number of roads connecting mining and cattle-raising areas intersected. Notably, it was a crossroads between the royal road which linked Tampico, San Luis Potosí and Zacatecas along with the road connecting Mexico City and Santa Fé. This made the town relatively easy to access and prompted authorities to build and maintain roads and bridges in the area, including a main highway connecting it to Guadalajara in 1717. The annual fair eventually drew merchants from many localities across central Mexico, including Querétaro, San Luis Potosí, San Juan del Río, Valle de Santiago, Celaya, Guadalajara, Valladolid, Aguascalientes and Zacatecas, many selling merchandise imported to New Spain from abroad through the ports of Veracruz or Acapulco.

The annual fair and other commercial activity in San Juan steadily grew in the 17th and 18th centuries, and the annual fair was formally recognized by a royal decree in Spain in 1797. However, the insurgent tendencies of the area in the early 1800s led colonial authorities to suppress the annual fair, and the area's economic importance declined. Royalist troops pursuing Miguel Hidalgo passed through the area in 1811. Although the area did recover economically after the War of Independence, it did not have the same relative value as it did before.

=== Independence to present ===
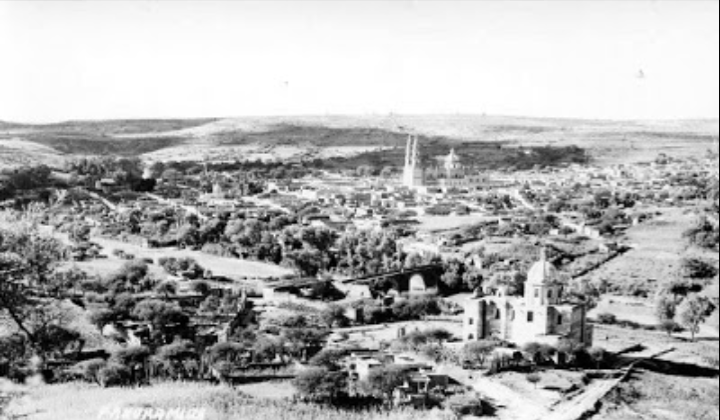
San Juan in earlier decades.

In 1824, the San Juan area was reorganized politically, and the city became the seat of its eponymous municipality. It was again recognized as a city in 1869.

Various confrontations during the Cristero War occurred in the environs of San Juan between 1926 and 1929.

The Roman Catholic diocese of San Juan was erected in 1972 as part of the archdiocese of Guadalajara.

The city's current seal was authorized by the municipality in 1987. It was designed by Gabriel Camarena Gutiérrez de Laris.

In 1990, Pope John Paul II visited San Juan in a pilgrimage to Our Lady of San Juan de los Lagos as part of his pastoral visit to Mexico. He officiated a mass for a crowd of six million.

== Geography ==
=== Climate ===
Climate data for San Juan de los Lagos (1951–2010)
Month	Jan	Feb	Mar	Apr	May	Jun	Jul	Aug	Sep	Oct	Nov	Dec	Year
Record high °C (°F)	37.0 (98.6)	36.0 (96.8)	38.0 (100.4)	39.0 (102.2)	45.0 (113.0)	42.0 (107.6)	38.0 (100.4)	40.0 (104.0)	39.0 (102.2)	40.0 (104.0)	37.0 (98.6)	36.8 (98.2)	45.0 (113.0)
Mean daily maximum °C (°F)	23.7 (74.7)	25.5 (77.9)	28.1 (82.6)	30.4 (86.7)	31.8 (89.2)	30.7 (87.3)	28.0 (82.4)	28.1 (82.6)	27.7 (81.9)	27.3 (81.1)	26.1 (79.0)	24.0 (75.2)	27.6 (81.7)
Daily mean °C (°F)	13.5 (56.3)	14.7 (58.5)	17.3 (63.1)	19.9 (67.8)	22.2 (72.0)	22.6 (72.7)	20.9 (69.6)	20.7 (69.3)	20.2 (68.4)	18.4 (65.1)	15.8 (60.4)	14.0 (57.2)	18.4 (65.0)
Mean daily minimum °C (°F)	3.3 (37.9)	3.8 (38.8)	6.6 (43.9)	9.4 (48.9)	12.7 (54.9)	14.6 (58.3)	13.7 (56.7)	13.3 (55.9)	12.7 (54.9)	9.6 (49.3)	5.6 (42.1)	3.9 (39.0)	9.1 (48.4)
Record low °C (°F)	−8.0 (17.6)	−5.0 (23.0)	−5.0 (23.0)	−0.5 (31.1)	6.0 (42.8)	4.3 (39.7)	9.0 (48.2)	8.2 (46.8)	0.5 (32.9)	0.0 (32.0)	−4.5 (23.9)	−5.0 (23.0)	−8.0 (17.6)
Average precipitation mm (inches)	12.3 (0.48)	6.7 (0.26)	5.7 (0.22)	7.7 (0.30)	23.6 (0.93)	126.5 (4.98)	183.3 (7.22)	175.4 (6.91)	128.2 (5.05)	45.1 (1.78)	11.3 (0.44)	11.5 (0.45)	737.3 (29.02)
Average precipitation days (≥ 0.1 mm)	1.8	1.0	1.1	1.3	3.6	11.8	17.1	16.8	11.4	5.3	1.6	1.9	74.7
Source: Servicio Meteorológico Nacional

The climate of San Juan is relatively dry and warm with mild winters. The average annual temperature is 19.1 °C, with, on average, about 19 days per year experiencing below freezing temperatures. Most precipitation falls in the summer months, amounting to more than 700 mm per year.

=== Topography ===
The city of San Juan de Los Lagos is in Jalisco state, about two hours northeast of Guadalajara, in the northeast corner of the state. The municipality is located in a region called Los Altos. It has a territory of 874.47 square kilometers, bordering the municipalities of Teocaltiche, Encarnación de Díaz, Jalostotitlan, San Miguel el Alto, San Julián, Unión de San Antonio and Lagos de Moreno.

The municipality has an average altitude of 1750 meters above mean sea level, with most of the area consisting of flat land or rolling hills, with altitude differences reaching only 200 meters. The lowest point is the San Juan River at 1700 meters, and the highest elevation is to the south, at the Lozano and Los Indios mesas at about 1900 meters.

The area is part of the Lerma River/Lake Chapala/Santiago River basin and the Verde/Grande de Belén/Santiago-Atotonilco River sub-basin. The main rivers through the municipality are San Juan (Lagos) and El Agostadero, with three dams Peña de León, Los Laureles and Alcalá. Streams include El Cedral, El Carrizo, San Antonio, El Barroso, El Corralillo, La Cañada, Mata Gorda, El Maguey, El Arrastradero, El Chilarillo, Santa Rosa, Los Trujillos and La Labor. There are also a number of fresh water springs including Santa Rosa and Charco del Tigre.

=== Flora and fauna ===
Most of the municipality is covered in arid grassland and other dry area plants such as cactus, maguey and arid scrub. About three hundred hectares is filled with dense vegetation, mostly cactus and thorny scrub. Predominant wildlife includes: coyotes, pumas, wildcats, wolves, deer (only in areas with abundant vegetation), rabbits, squirrels, opossums, armadillos and moles.

== Socioeconomics ==
The municipality as a whole is ranked as having a medium level of socioeconomic marginalization. Of the 260 active communities, most are designated as having a medium or high level of marginalization. However, since the vast majority of the municipality's population lives in the city of San Juan de los Lagos proper, which has a low level of marginalization, the ameliorates the situation. As of 2010, there were 15,088 housing units in the municipality. Most housing is privately owned by its occupants, mostly with a poured concrete foundation and with walks of cinderblock, bricks or adobe. Roofs are mostly of poured concrete or vaults made with bricks. Basic services such as running water and electricity are available in about 90% of homes.

Agriculture takes up about half of the municipality's territory, with most farmland privately owned. It employs about 22% of the working population. Principal crops are corn, beans and sorghum, with livestock consisting of meat and dairy cattle, oxen, pigs, sheep, goats and domestic fowl. There is also some fish farming producing catfish, carp and mojarra for local consumption. There is some exploitation of mesquite trees for wood.

Mining and industry employ about 24% of the working population. Mining mostly consists of sandstone production for construction with some deposits of marble and other construction materials. Most industry consists of food processing, much of which is destined for sale to the tourist market. This is particularly true for the production and sale of cajeta or dulce de leche. This is a common traditional product as the Los Altos region is the fifth highest producer of dairy products in the country. Other products include ice, construction materials, ironworking, textiles and furniture.

Handcrafts include embroidered clothing for women as well as the weaving of wool items such as sarapes, rebozos, quezquémetls and other textiles, herbal medicines, leather items such as bags, belts and wallets are made as well as ceramics and carved stone items. Clothing for charros can be found here from heavily embroidered jackets and pants to embroidered belts called "piteado." Another common handcraft is religious items for sale to visitors, such as reliquaries, candles, images of the Virgin and rosaries made from the local white stone. Many of the areas handcrafts are sold on the stores and street stalls around the main plaza and basilica. These items are either made locally or brought in from other states in central Mexico.

Just under fifty percent of the working population is dedicated to commerce and services, with most of this related to tourism to the city of San Juan de los Lagos, followed by businesses catering to local, mostly primary, needs. This translates to a population of about 40,000 residents who cater to the needs of about seven million or so pilgrims per year. The city has frequent bus service, and is accessible by expressway. However, this tourism is almost purely domestic. Most English language guidebooks do not even mention San Juan de los Lagos.

== The City ==
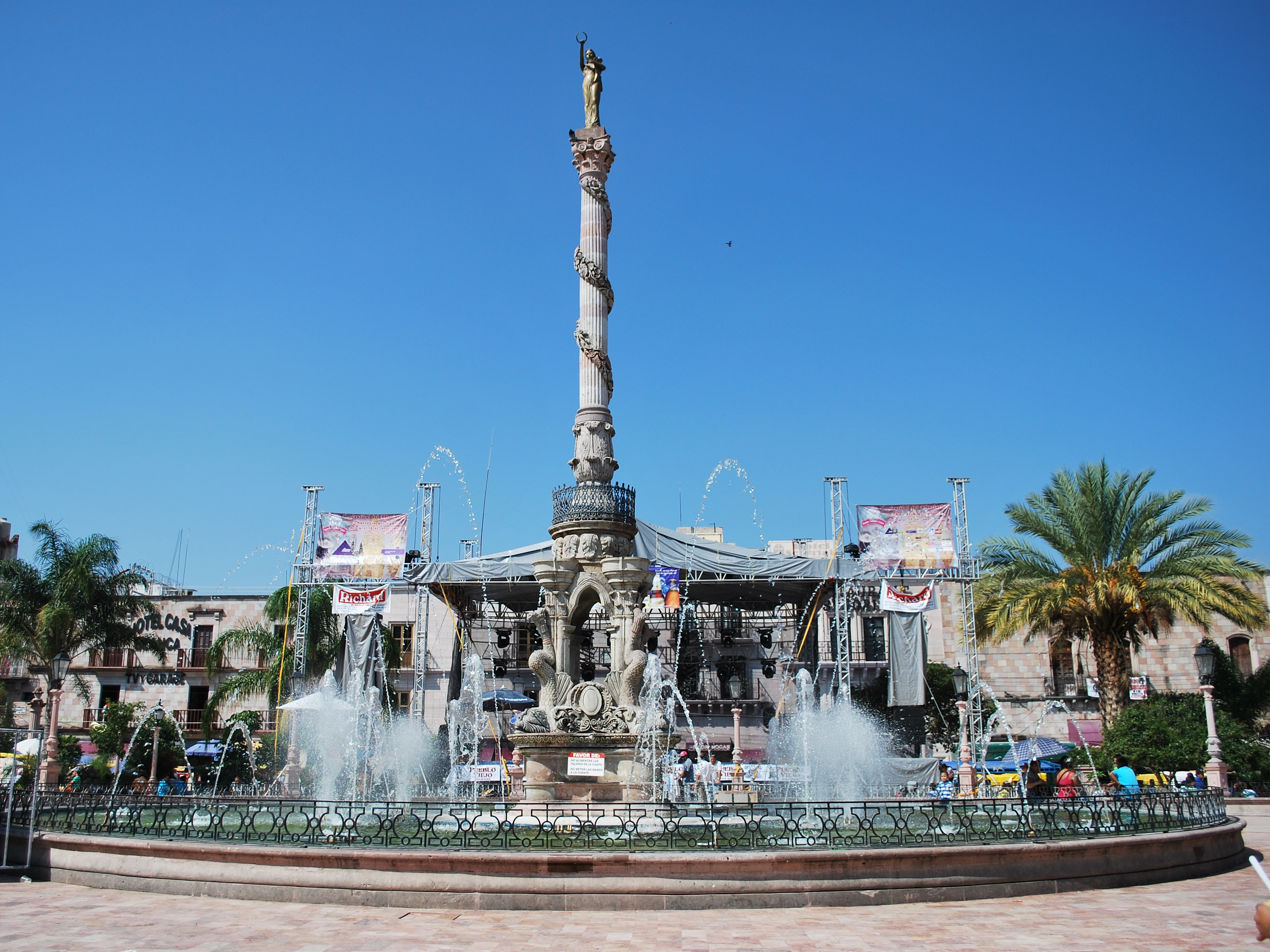
Fountain in the main square

Many of the buildings in the center of the city are made of pink sandstone dating as far back as the 17th century, with the streets fanning out from the main square. There are twenty two historically notable buildings in the city. These include four parish churches in the municipality, Sangre de Cristo, San Jose, San Juan Bautista and Sagrada Familia and two chapels Primer Milagro and El Calvario.

The Plaza de Armas or Rita Pérez de Moreno Civic Plaza is in the center of the city. It was designed by Roque Picaso in the 18th century, and later modified by Salvador Gómez. In the center, there is a Monument to Independence, erected in 1872. It consists of a thin column supported by a base which has four dragon figures. At the top, there is marble sculpture of a woman holding a laurel crown. The monument stand in the center of a large circular fountain.

The Cathedral/Basilica of the Virgin of San Juan de los Lagos faces the main square of the city, and dates to 1732. It has a facade of pink sandstone with two narrow Baroque towers and a portal with three levels and a crest. In this portal, there are Tuscan columns and cornices along with geometric and anthropomorphic reliefs. The interior has stained glass windows and a cupola with painted scenes. The walls and ceiling of the nave are richly decorated with gold leaf and cypress woodwork, especially in the capitols, pilasters and other niches. The main altar is made of sandstone and cypress in Neoclassical style. In the center is the image of the Virgin of San Juan de los Lagos. The sacristy contains oil paintings and furniture with incrustations. The chamber behind the main altar contains six works by Rubens.

On the side opposite from the Basilica is the municipal palace. It was constructed at the end of the 18th century of stone covered in sandstone tiles. It originally was a house, then a seminary, before its current function which began in 1938. During the War of Independence, it temporarily housed viceroy Felix Maria Calleja while he and his troops were pursuing Miguel Hidalgo.

The Chapel of the First Miracle was first built as a hermitage in the 1530s. The current structure dates from the 17th century. Its facade is simple, made of sandstone with a single tower that has Corinthian columns and vegetative reliefs. The portal is simple with a rounded arch. The choral window has a sandstone frame and niches above it with sculptures. The interior is a single nave with a main altar in Baroque style in white sandstone, with Solomonic columns that support a semicircular pediment. The rest of the decoration is simple with some sculptures of saints on the walls. To the side of this chapel is a former hospital, which also has a simple facade and portal.

The Capilla del Pocito is where, according to legend, a small girl brought forth a fresh water spring in 1663 by striking the area with a stone. The spring still flows.

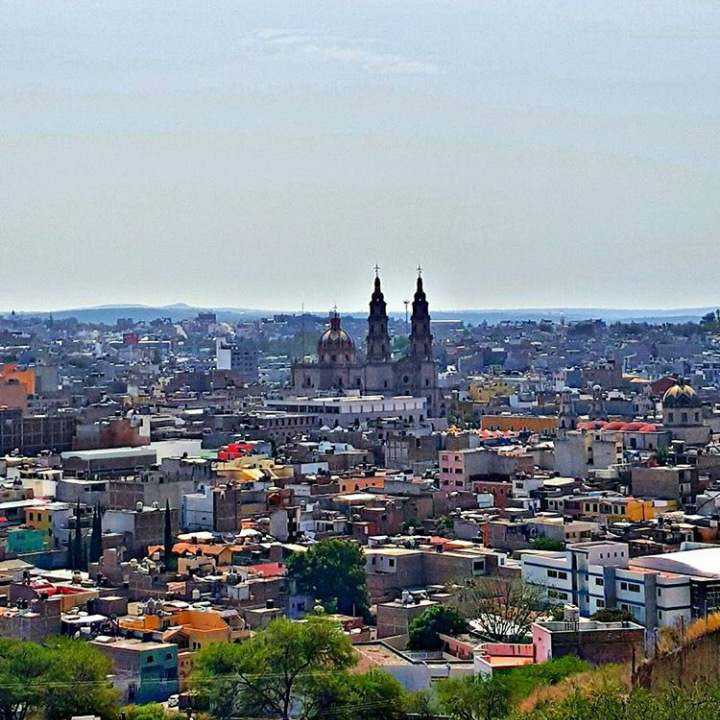
A colonial view of San Juan from La Mesa.

The Temple of Calvary dates from the 17th century, constructed in pink sandstone. It has the appearance of a Greek temple with stairways, arches and columns. The facade features large sculptures of the Twelve Apostles.

The Parish of San Juan Bautista was constructed in 1648. The Temple of the Holy Family was constructed in 1841 in Neoclassical style. The Parish of Sangre de Cristo was constructed at the beginning of the 19th century.

The Rita Pérez School was built in the 1770s in Neocolonial style. It began as a gambling house, then an inn and barracks. In 1949, it was converted into a school by the municipality.

The Old Episcopal House was rebuilt in the 19th century and currently houses the post and telegraph offices.

The Casa de Correos became the Casa de Cultura. It is located on one side of the main plaza.

The festival dedicated to the Virgin of Candlemas, celebrated from 25 January to 2 February is the most important for the municipality. It is celebrated with processions, live music, various traditional dances such as Moors and Christians by the many visitors from all over Mexico. There are also fireworks and amusement rides.

The Fiestas de la Primavera (Spring Festivals) are held for five days at the end of May with bullfights, live music, dances and cockfights. This concurs with events dedicated to the Virgin Mary which are held through the entire month. During Holy Week, it is customary to visit all seven churches of the main city.

In 2010, the Secretary of Tourism for the state began a Festival of Mariachi, Charrería and Tequila in the city to coincide with the Independence Day holiday in San Juan. It is part of an effort to revive certain area traditions. In addition to traditional dance and music, local tequila and mezcal producers offer samples of their products. There is also a parade with floats and mojigangas and a beauty contests featuring representatives from the various communities of Los Altos.

During festivals and other times, various local foods are available. Typical dishes include pozole, tamales, milk candies and cajeta (dulce de leche) and fruits such as cactus fruit, oranges and figs preserved in sugar. Traditional drinks include ponche made from local fruits. Another traditional confection is a large disk of a coconut confection called "alfajor."

== Pilgrimage site of Our Lady of San Juan de los Lagos ==
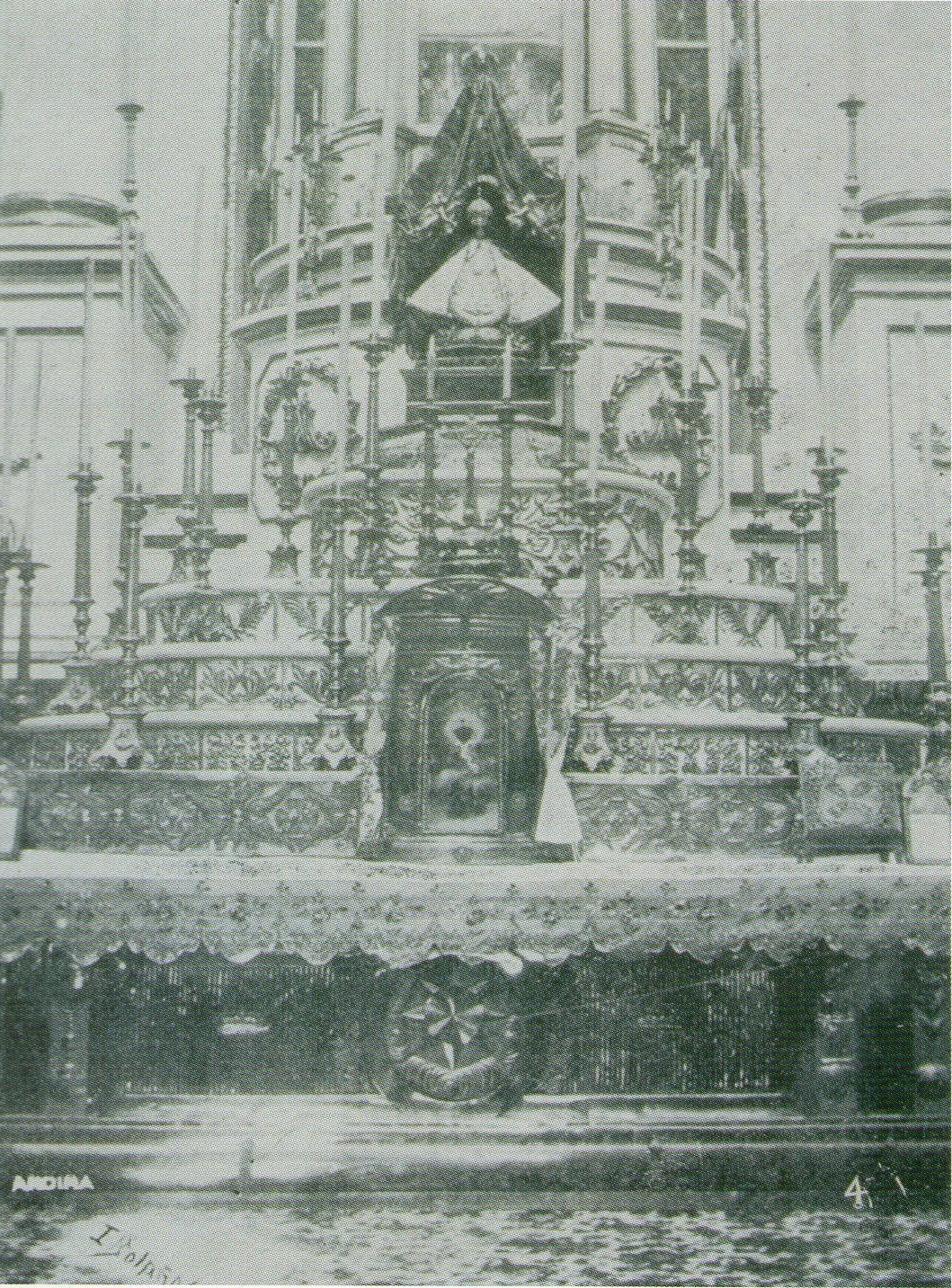
The image of Our Lady of San Juan de los Lagos at the basilica's main altar on the Feast of the Assumption, 15 August 1904.

The pilgrims come to the city to pay homage to a small image of the Virgin Mary called Our Lady of San Juan de los Lagos, but sometimes referred to by her Nahuatl name of Cihuapilli, which means "Great Lady." This image is very small, about 38 cm tall, made of sugar cane paste and believed to have been brought to the area from Michoacán in the early 1500s. The first important miracle ascribed to the image dates to 1623. A family of acrobats had a show which included "flying" over a field of spear points. The seven-year-old daughter fell onto the spears during the act and immediately died. Local women brought the image to the body and prayed over it when the child revived. This miracle made the image famous. Since then, many other miracles have since been attributed to her intercession, often related to recuperation from mortal danger or dangerous illnesses.

The original hermitage that stored the image was built in 1543, with the first chapel dedicated specifically to the image build in the 1638. The current basilica/cathedral was begun in 1732 and was finished except for the bell towers in 1779. This church was made possible by a steady flow of offerings to the image that continued from colonial times until the Mexican Revolution. This war reduced the flow of pilgrims and gifts but both returned after and have kept the city and image a major religious attraction for the country. In 1904 the Pope granted permission for the crowning of the image. The church was elevated to a minor basilica in 1947, and to a cathedral in 1972. Pope John Paul II came to San Juan de los Lagos to visit the image in 1990. The statue of the virgin was restored by sculptors in 2005.

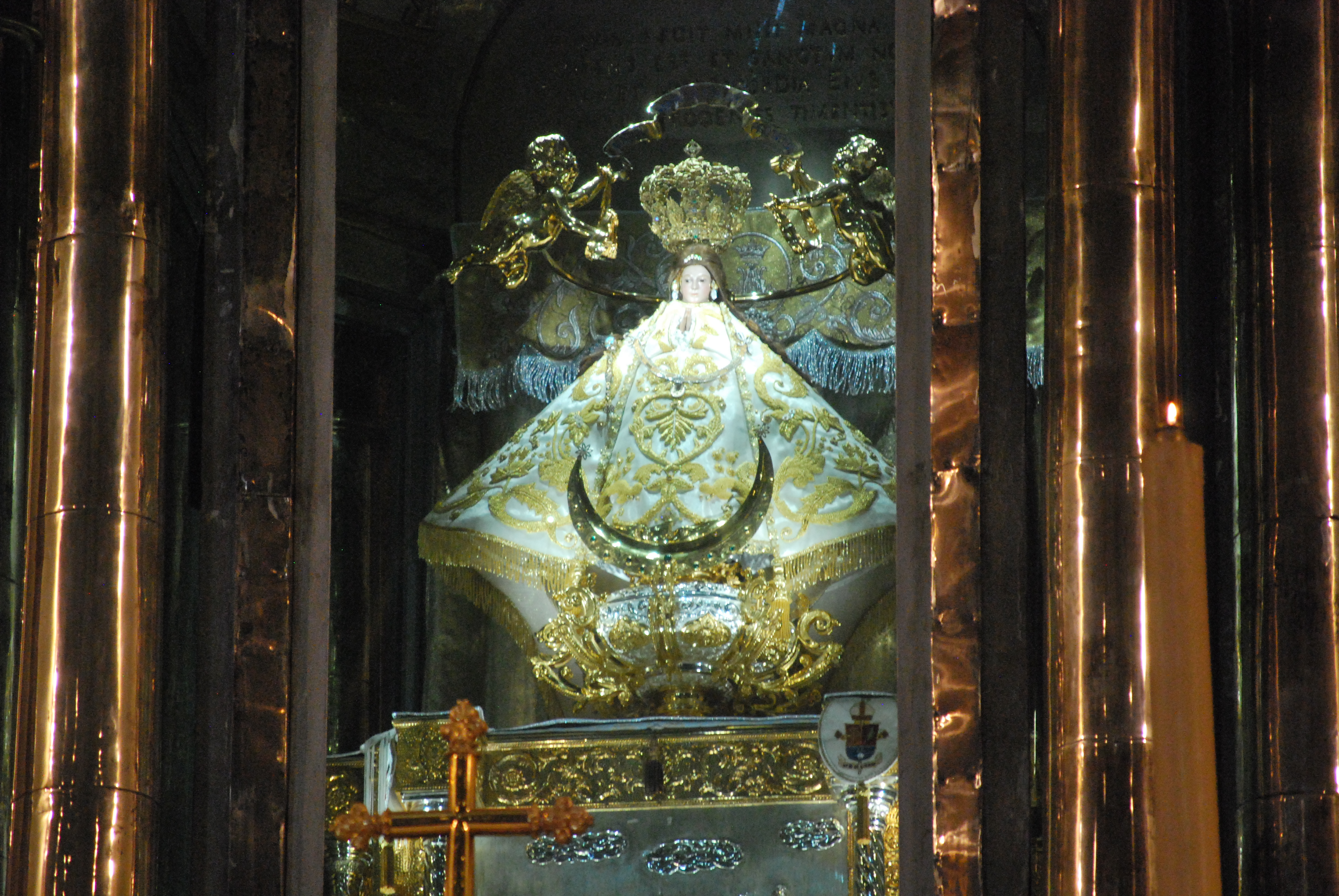
Image of Our Lady of San Juan de los Lagos in her basilica

San Juan de los Lagos is the second most visited pilgrimage site in Mexico, after the Basilica of Our Lady of Guadalupe in Mexico City. It is an important tourist attraction for the state of Jalisco. Hundreds visit the basilica every day, with estimates of yearly visits usually numbering around seven million, but estimated at nine million for 2009. On religious holidays, the church and its immediate surroundings are packed. The most important days for this image are February 2, most of May, August 15 and December 8, those times associated with Mary. Two million come during Candlemas alone. At peak visitation times, the crowd spill out from the basilica and crowd onto the streets of the city. Church authorities indicate that there is a severe need to improve facilities for the pilgrims and provide more space. During peak periods, demand for hotel space far exceeds supply and the municipally opens shelters with basic services. The shelter has been constructed to accommodate 20,000 pilgrims but it is insufficient at peak times.

Organized groups may walk or bike for hundreds of miles, but most arrive by car or bus. Many pilgrims will cross the entire nave in their knees, and most are there to fill a promise to the Virgin image. Most pilgrims come to "repay" the image for a miracle received, an obligation called a "manda." According to popular belief, those who fail to fulfill a "manda" to the Virgin risk being turned into stone. One of the common actions of pilgrims is to leave a small image called a votive painting for the image. Traditionally, these are images hand painted onto wood or metal depicting a miracle attributed to the Virgin image. Most have details with dates and names. So many have been left here that only a small fraction can be seen at any time, those most recently deposited. The atrium of the basilica is often filled with traditional dancers done as an offering to the Virgin. For Candlemas, the most important day associated with this image, the morning begins with the singing of Las Mañanitas, traditional dancers and the sharing of tamales and atole.

== Government ==
=== Municipal presidents ===
Municipal president	Term	Political party	Notes
Francisco L. Reynoso Pérez	1914		
J. Miguel Zermeño Sánchez	1915		
Manuel Jasso	1915		
R. Machaiy	1915		
J. M. Vázquez del Mercado	1915		
Demetrio Hernández Soria	1915		
Francisco Padilla y Padilla	1915		
G. Ulloa	1915		
Pascasio Muñoz Padilla	1915		
Manuel Montero Romo	1915–1916		
José Sixto Pérez Alba	1916		
Salvador González Romo	1916–1918		
J. Trinidad Zenón de la Torre	1918		
José Manuel T. Romo	1918		
J. Trinidad Zenón de la Torre	1918		
J. Jesús Padilla González	1918–1919		
Salvador González Romo	1919		
Francisco E. Romo González	1919		
Salvador González Romo	1919		
Francisco E. Romo González	1919		
Salvador González Romo	1919		
Francisco E. Romo González	1919		
Salvador González Romo	1919		
Francisco E. Romo González	1919		
J. Trinidad de la Torre de Alba	1920		
Manuel de J. Zermeño Sánchez	1920–1921		
José Abundio de Alba Jiménez	1921		
Manuel de J. Zermeño Sánchez	1921		
José Abundio de Alba Jiménez	1921		
Francisco L. Reynoso Pérez	1921		
J. Jesús Padilla González	1921		
Roberto A. Padilla	1921		
Daniel Macías Muñoz	1921		
Reinaldo de Alba Jiménez	1921		
Daniel Macías Muñoz	1921		
Ezequiel de Alba	1922		
J. Trinidad Zenón de la Torre	1922		
J. Jesús Padilla González	1922		
J. Trinidad Zenón de la Torre	1922		
Francisco E. Romo González	1922		
J. Trinidad Zenón de la Torre	1922		
Francisco E. Romo González	1922		
J. Trinidad Zenón de la Torre	1922		
Francisco E. Romo González	1922		
J. Trinidad Zenón de la Torre	1922		
Francisco E. Romo González	1922		
J. Trinidad Zenón de la Torre	1922		
Francisco E. Romo González	1922		
J. Trinidad Zenón de la Torre	1922–1923		
Salvador González Romo	1923		
Bulmaro Ibarra	1923		
Salvador González Romo	1923		
Bulmaro Ibarra	1923		
Salvador González Romo	1923		
Bulmaro Ibarra	1923		
Salvador González Romo	1923		
Bulmaro Ibarra	1923		
Salvador González Romo	1923		
Bulmaro Ibarra	1923–1924		
Ezequiel de Alba	1924		
J. Jesús González Montoya	1924		
Ezequiel de Alba	1925		
Pascual Martín Jiménez	1925		
Ezequiel de Alba	1925–1926		
José Benedicto González R.	1926		
Susano Castañeda	1926		
José Leónides Padilla P.	1926		
Pablo Esqueda Campos	1926		
José Benedicto González R.	1926		
Pablo Esqueda Campos	1926–1927		
José Benedicto González R.	1927		
José Sixto Pérez Alba	1927		
Silverio López	1927–1928		
J. Refugio Paredes Sánchez	1928		
Silverio López	1928		
J. Jesús Padilla González	1928		
José Rougón González	1928		
J. Jesús Padilla González	1928–1929		
Jesús María Escoto Padilla	1929		
J. Jesús Padilla González	1929		
Francisco L. Reynoso Pérez	1929	PNR	
J. Trinidad Zenón de la Torre	1930	PNR	
José Sixto Pérez Alba	1930	PNR	
J. Trinidad Zenón de la Torre	1930	PNR	
José Sixto Pérez Alba	1930	PNR	
J. Trinidad Zenón de la Torre	1930	PNR	
José Sixto Pérez Alba	1930	PNR	
J. Trinidad Zenón de la Torre	1930	PNR	
José Sixto Pérez Alba	1930	PNR	
J. Trinidad Zenón de la Torre	1930	PNR	
José Sixto Pérez Alba	1930	PNR	
J. Trinidad Zenón de la Torre	1930	PNR	
José Sixto Pérez Alba	1930	PNR	
J. Trinidad Zenón de la Torre	1930	PNR	
José Sixto Pérez Alba	1930	PNR	
J. Trinidad Zenón de la Torre	1930	PNR	
J. Martín Reynoso Sánchez	1931	PNR	
José Rougón González	1931	PNR	
J. Martín Reynoso Sánchez	1931	PNR	
Luis de Alba Luna	1931	PNR	
Telésforo Macías Muñoz	1932	PNR	
Pedro de Anda Muñoz	1932	PNR	
Telésforo Macías Muñoz	1932	PNR	
Pedro de Anda Muñoz	1932	PNR	
Telésforo Macías Muñoz	1932	PNR	
Pedro de Anda Muñoz	1932	PNR	
Telésforo Macías Muñoz	1932–1933	PNR	
Pedro de Anda Muñoz	1933	PNR	
Telésforo Macías Muñoz	1933	PNR	
Pedro de Anda Muñoz	1933	PNR	
Telésforo Macías Muñoz	1933	PNR	
Pedro de Anda Muñoz	1933	PNR	
Telésforo Macías Muñoz	1933	PNR	
Luis G. Gutiérrez	1934	PNR	
Rafael Pérez de León	1934	PNR	
Luis G. Gutiérrez	1934	PNR	
Rafael Pérez de León	1934	PNR	
Luis G. Gutiérrez	1934	PNR	
José Benedicto González Romo	1935	PNR	
Pablo Esqueda Campos	1935	PNR	
José Benedicto González Romo	1935	PNR	
Pablo Esqueda Campos	1935	PNR	
José Benedicto González Romo	1935	PNR	
Pablo Esqueda Campos	1936	PNR	
José Benedicto González Romo	1936	PNR	
Jesús María Escoto Padilla	1937	PNR	
Pastor Padilla González	1937	PNR	
Rafael Pérez de León	1938	PNR	
Salvador de Alba Flores	1938	PNR	
Rafael Pérez de León	1938	PRM	
Salvador de Alba Flores	1938	PRM	
Rafael Pérez de León	1938–1939	PRM	
Ramón Paredes Sánchez	1939	PRM	
Rafael Pérez de León	1939	PRM	
Ramón Paredes Sánchez	1940	PRM	
Enrique González Barba	1941	PRM	
Pablo Esqueda Campos	1942	PRM	
José Leónides Padilla P.	1943–1944	PRM	
Juan Macías Gutiérrez	1945–1946	PRM	
Rafael Pérez de León	1947	PRI	
Miguel Gallardo Martín	1947	PRI	
Rafael Pérez de León	1947–1948	PRI	
Álvaro Padilla Campos	1948	PRI	
Rafael Pérez de León	1948	PRI	
Pablo Esqueda Campos	1949–1952	PRI	
José Alfonso de la Torre de Alba	01-01-1953–31-12-1955	PRI	
José Ma. Romo Carbajal	01-01-1956–31-12-1958	PRI	
Francisco Gutiérrez Herrera	01-01-1959–31-12-1961	PRI	
Gabriel Pérez de León	01-01-1962–31-12-1964	PRI	
Javier de la Torre de Alba	01-01-1965–31-12-1967	PRI	
Marcelino Romo de Anda	01-01-1968–31-12-1970	PRI	
Noel Pérez de Anda	01-01-1971–31-12-1973	PRI	
Augusto Pérez Padilla	01-01-1974–31-12-1976	PRI	
Raúl Martín Martín	01-01-1977–31-12-1979	PRI	
Rafael Pérez de Anda	1980–1982	PRI	
José de Jesús García Cuéllar	1983–1985	PRI	
Juan Enrique Leal Palos	1986		
Eduardo Palacios Barba	1986–1988		President of the Municipal Council
Juan Ruiz García	1989–1992	PRI	
Miguel Macías de Rueda	1992–1995	PAN	
Leocadio Macías Muñoz	1995–1997	PRI	
Moisés Loza García	01-01-1998–31-12-2000	PAN	
Vicente García Campos	01-01-2001–2003	PVEM	
Miguel Reyes Martín	2003	PVEM	Acting municipal president
Vicente García Campos	2003	PVEM	Resumed
Ismael de Jesús Gutiérrez Padilla	01-01-2004–31-12-2006	PVEM	
Alejandro de Anda Lozano	01-01-2007–2009	PAN	
Jair Alexander González Plascencia	2009	PAN	Acting municipal president
Alejandro de Anda Lozano	2009	PAN	Resumed
José Raúl de Alba Padilla	01-01-2010–2012	PAN	
Francisco Javier Guzmán Loza	2012	PAN	Acting municipal president
Heriberto Atilano González	01-10-2012–30-09-2015	PRI; PVEM	Coalition "Compromise for Jalisco"
Alejandro de Anda Lozano	01-10-2015–05-04-2018	PAN	Applied for a leave
Ángel Hernández Campos	05-04-2018–2018	PAN	Acting municipal president
Jesús Ubaldo Medina Briseño	01-10-2018–04-03-2021	Panal	Applied for a leave
Juan Pablo García Hernández	04-03-2021–2021	Panal	Acting municipal president
Alejandro de Anda Lozano	01-10-2021–	PAN	
