= Cathedral Basilica of San Juan de los Lagos =

Coordinates: 21.2454°N 102.3340°W

Cathedral Basilica of Our Lady of St. John of the Lakes
- Catedral Basílica de Nuestra Señora de San Juan de los Lagos
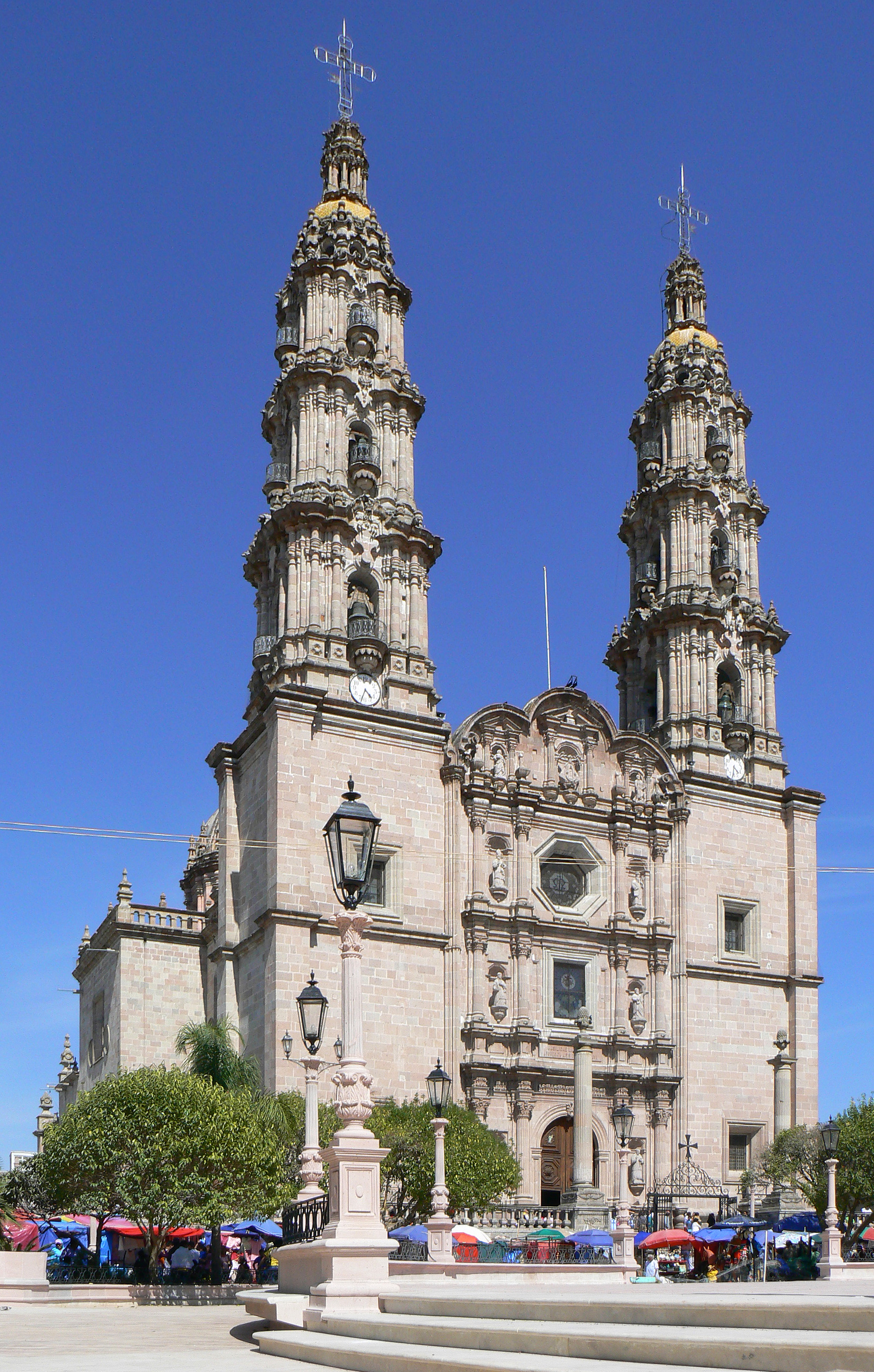
- Cathedral Basilica of Our Lady of St. John of the Lakes
- Location: San Juan de los Lagos
- Country: Mexico
- Denomination: Catholic
- Tradition: Roman Rite

History
- Dedication: Our Lady of San Juan de los Lagos

Architecture
- Groundbreaking: 30 November 1732
- Completed: 1769

The Cathedral Basilica of Our Lady of St. John of the Lakes (Spanish: Catedral Basílica de Nuestra Señora de San Juan de los Lagos), also called San Juan de los Lagos Cathedral, is a Catholic church located in the city of San Juan de los Lagos, in the state of Jalisco, Mexico, the seat of the Diocese of San Juan de los Lagos. This Cathedral-Basilica ranks second in the number of visitors in the country (more than 7 million pilgrims a year) after the Basilica of Our Lady of Guadalupe.

The importance of this church lies in the veneration of the image of the Virgin that was donated to the city in 1542 by the Franciscan friar Miguel de Bolonia, whose evangelizing tours from Juchipila included the towns of Teocaltiche and Jalostotitlán in the current region of Los Altos de Jalisco. This image has been considered miraculous since colonial times. Its titular feast is celebrated on December 8, the day of the Immaculate Conception, but the feast of Candelaria on February 2 and the feast of the Assumption of the Virgin into heaven on August 15 are also celebrated with great solemnity. In addition, the entire month of May is celebrated in a special way with processions of the different guilds and neighborhoods of the city.

== History ==
The first shrine was built by Diego de Camarena in 1642, now known as the Chapel of the First Miracle (Capilla del Primer Milagro). Later, in 1682, he completed the construction of the second sanctuary, which is now the parish of San Juan Bautista. In the period 1732–1769, Carlos Cervantes, bishop of Guadalajara, was responsible for the construction of the current basilica. This earned the rank of cathedral 1972, through the Apostolic Constitution IOANNOPOLITANAE A LACUBUS ET GUSMANOPOLITANAE of Pope Paul VI.

== Description ==
The church has a Spanish Baroque façade, a Latin cross layout and Gothic moldings on its vaults.

The miracle working image of the Virgin of San Juan de los Lagos is located under a canopy, a beautifully crafted niche with a circular floor plan supported by Ionic columns. Under this canopy, the metal and glass case that houses the image is covered with a raised silver dome that culminates at the top with the figure of the Holy Spirit, made by the goldsmith Epitacio Garabito.

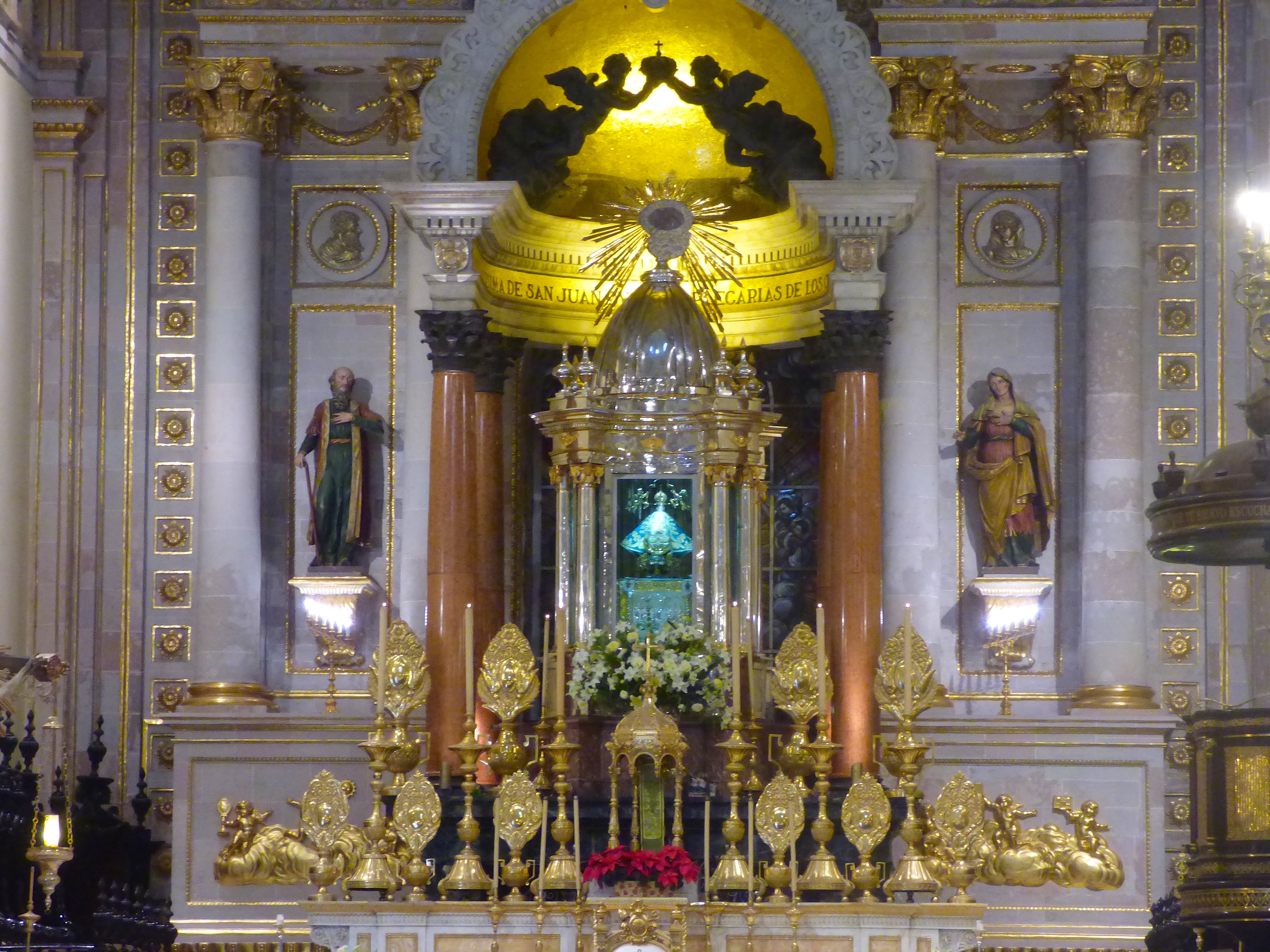

The main altar culminates at the top, above the canopy, with a large semicircular tympanum in the center of which is the magnificent sculpture of the Assumption of the Virgin Mary, also made by the meticulous neoclassical sculptor Victoriano Acuña, framed with a double molding on the sides and at the top a band that corresponds to a section of the semicircular arch that closes it. On the sides are the sculptures of Saint Joseph on the left and Saint John the Baptist on the right.

The Stations of the Cross are framed in silver, and the sacristy has four paintings attributed to Rubens.

== See also ==
- Basilica of the National Shrine of Our Lady of San Juan del Valle
- Roman Catholicism in Mexico
- Cathedral Basilica of Our Lady

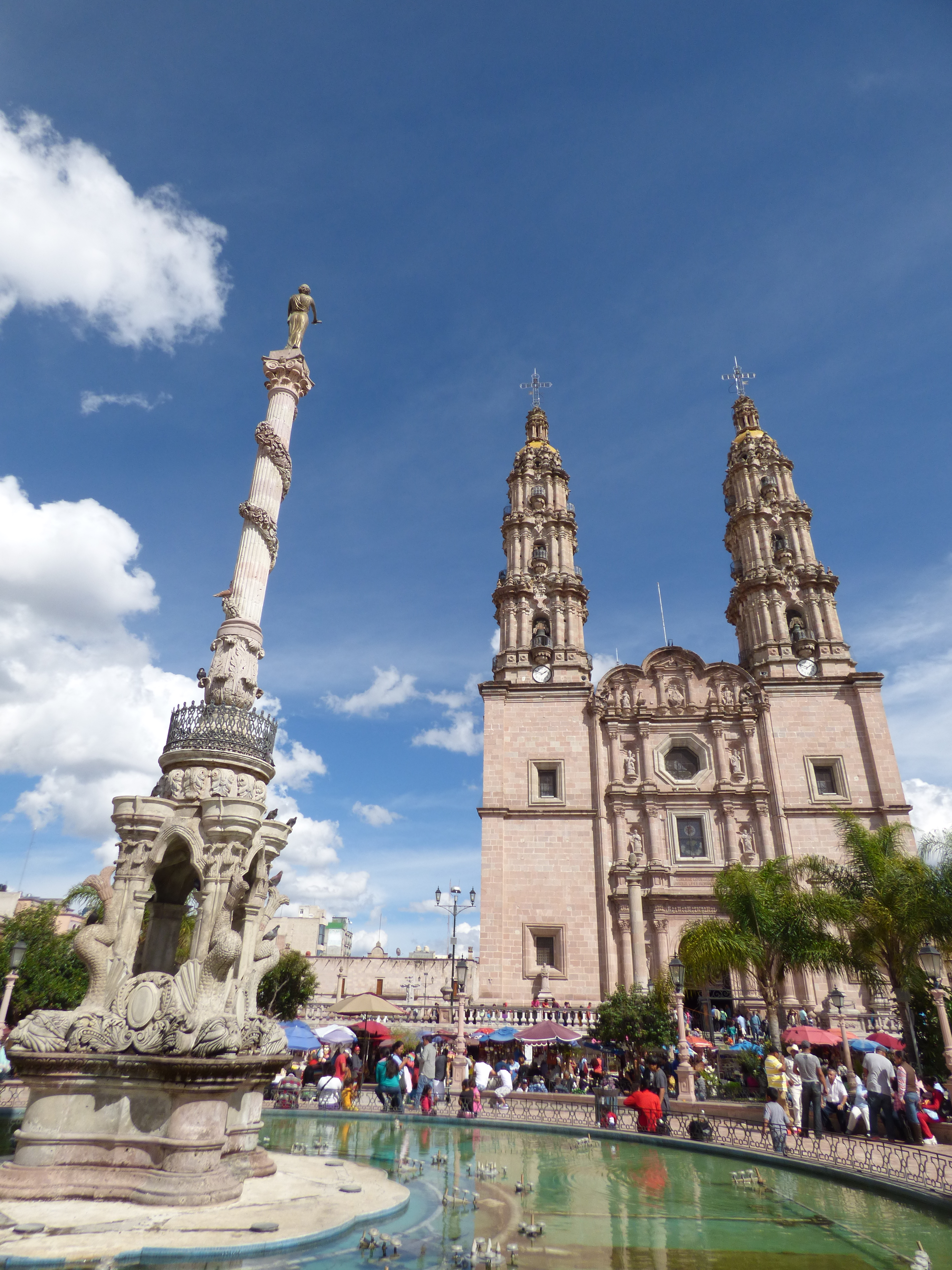
Another View
