= San Miguel el Alto =

- Municipality
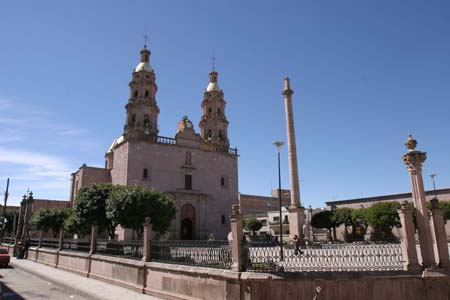

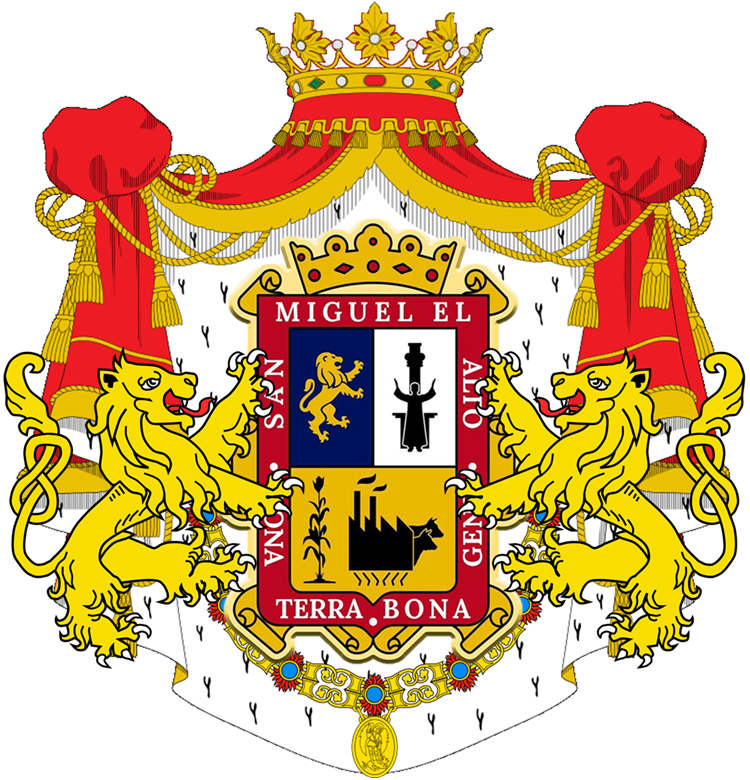
- Coat of arms

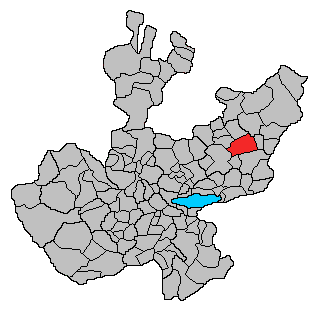
- Location of the municipality in Jalisco

- Location in Mexico
- Coordinates: 21°1′25″N 102°24′21″W
- Country: Mexico
- State: Jalisco

Government
  - Presidente: Luis Alfonso Navarro Trujillo

Area
  - Municipality: 787 km^{2} (304 sq mi)
  - Town: 7.23 km^{2} (2.79 sq mi)

Population (2020 census)
  - Municipality: 31,965
  - Density: 40.6/km^{2} (105/sq mi)
  - Town: 25,925
  - Town density: 3,590/km^{2} (9,290/sq mi)
- Time zone: UTC-6 (Central Standard Time)

San Miguel el Alto is a town and municipality, in Jalisco in central-western Mexico. The municipality covers an area of 787 km^{2}.

As of 2005, the municipality had a total population of 26,971.

The municipality includes the town of San José de los Reynoso.

== In popular culture ==
It was the setting and filming location for the 1957 film, Los chiflados del rock and roll, starring Luis Aguilar.

== Fiestas ==
San Miguel is known for its beautiful patronal festival that lasts from 19 September to 29 September. The celebration is in honor of Saint Michael the Arch Angel. Many events like horse races, artist performance, fireworks, and the coronation of the fiesta queen take place.

== Sister cities ==
- Big Spring, Texas, EE. UU.
- Jalostotitlan, Jalisco
- San Julian, Jalisco
- Arandas, Jalisco
- Valle de Guadalupe, Jalisco
