= Our Lady of San Juan de los Lagos =

Roman Catholic title of the Virgin Mary in Jalisco, Mexico

Our Lady of San Juan de los Lagos Our Lady of Saint John of the Lakes
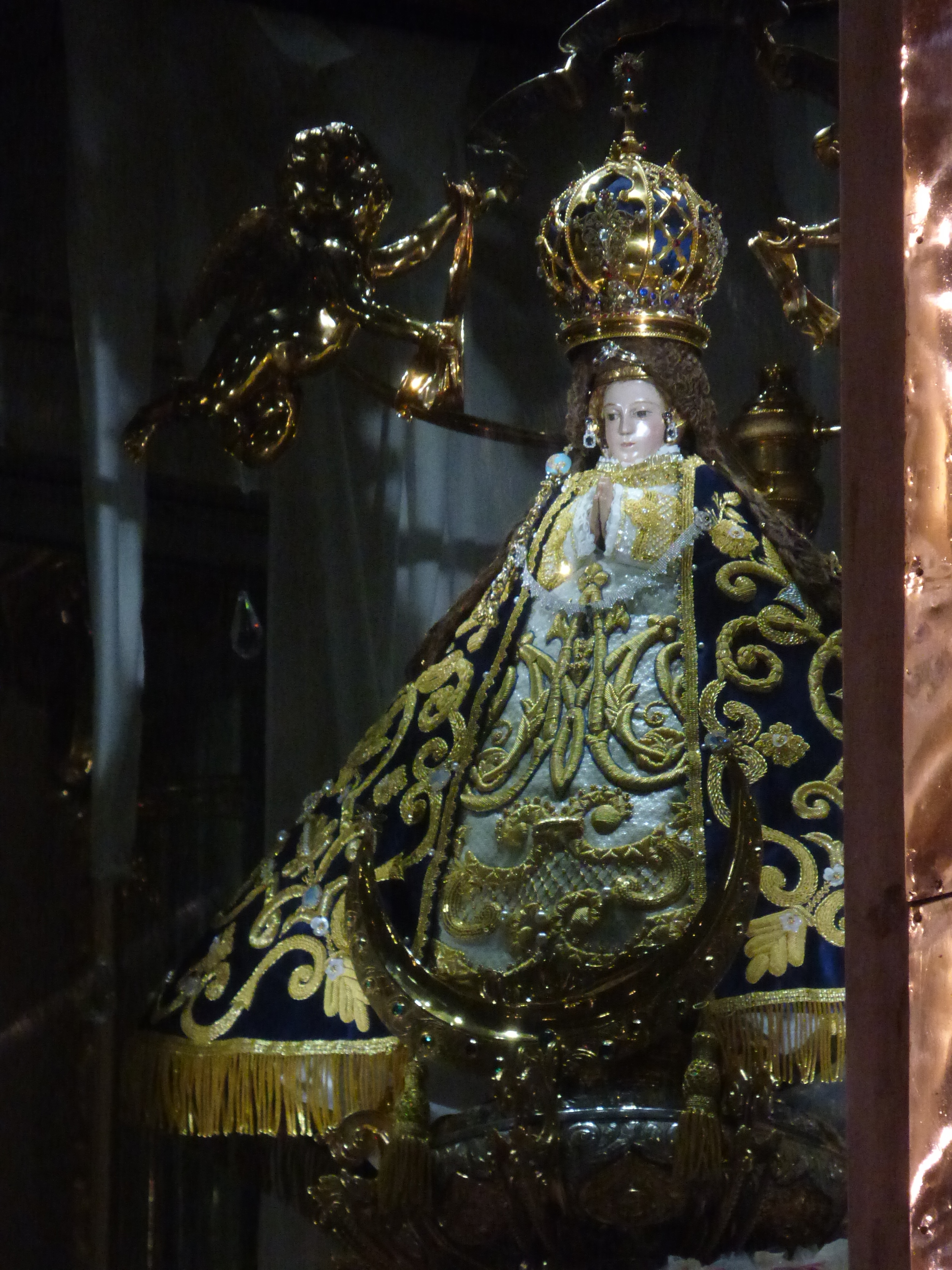

Virgen de San Juan de los Lagos Patroness of San Juan de los Lagos
- Venerated in: Catholic Church (Roman Rite)
- Major shrine: Basilica of San Juan de los Lagos
- Feast: 2 February; 24 June; 15 August; 8 December
- Attributes: Blessed Virgin Mary in prayer, golden crown, white gown, blue mantle, silver banner held by angels
- Patronage: San Juan de los Lagos

Our Lady of San Juan de los Lagos (English: Our Lady of Saint John of the Lakes) is a Roman Catholic title of the Blessed Virgin Mary venerated by Mexican and Texan faithful. The original image is a popular focus for pilgrims and is located in the state of Jalisco, in central Mexico, 122 kilometers (76 mi) northeast of the city of Guadalajara. The statue is venerated both in Mexico and in the United States where it is known by its proxy title Nuestra Señora de San Juan del Valle (Our Lady of Saint John of the Valley), mainly focused in Texas.

Pope Pius X granted the image a Pontifical decree of Canonical coronation on 29 January 1904. The rite of coronation was executed on 15 August 1904 via the Archbishop of Guadalajara, Jose de Jesus Ortiz y Rodriguez.

The image is widely known for the jeweled regalia offered by its devotees and is permanently enshrined at the Basilica Minor of San Juan de los Lagos in Mexico.

== History ==
The sanctuary's history begins in 1543 when Father Miguel de Bologna, a Spanish priest, brought a statue of the Virgin of the Immaculate Conception to the village. The town was then called San Juan Mezquititlan Baptist but its name was changed to San Juan de Los Lagos in 1623. According to local histories, and some eyewitness accounts, a certain aerial acrobat was traveling along the Camino Real, "the Royal Highway," from San Luis Potosí to Guadalajara, performing in the towns along the way. His act included his wife and two daughters. His stunts included swinging from one high point to another by means of ropes, in somewhat the same fashion as trapeze artists of today. To add excitement and an element of danger, the artists had to fly over swords and knives that were stuck in the ground with their points positioned upward.

While performing in the village, the younger daughter, a child of six or seven, slipped, fell upon the knives and was mortally wounded. After preparing the body and wrapping it in burial cloths, the grieving parents brought the child's body to the chapel of Our Lady of San Juan for burial.

Meeting them at the door of the chapel was the 78-year-old Ana Lucia, the wife of Pedro Antes (the caretaker and custodian of the beloved statue). Feeling pity for the grieving family, she exhorted them to have confidence in The Virgin, who could restore the child to them. Taking the statue from its altar in the sacristy where it had been consigned because of its poor condition, Ana Lucia laid it near the child's dead body. In a few moments, they detected a slight movement under the shroud. The parents quickly unwrapped the cloth to discover the child well and unharmed. This first miracle of Our Lady of San Juan de Los Lagos became known in neighboring villages and towns. Numerous other miracles and favors followed, until now Our Lady is venerated by pilgrims from throughout Mexico and the United States.

Following this miracle, the statue began to be venerated by an increasing number of pilgrims including Indians, Spanish and mestizos. During this period the statue acquired its own local identity as Our Lady of San Juan de los Lagos. Between the early 17th century and the middle of the 19th century a pilgrimage fair was held each year on November 30 to celebrate the original installation of the statue in the shrine.

== The basilica ==
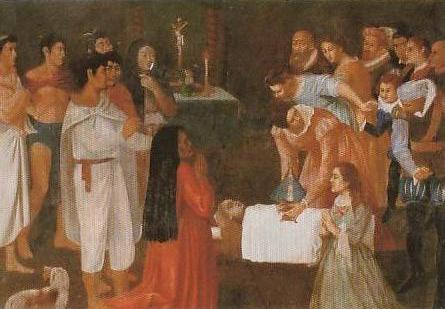
Fresco

The present church, begun in 1732, was built in the Mexican baroque style. The statue of the Virgin was installed in 1769 and the bell towers were completed in 1790. In 1972 the church was recognized as a basilica. Inside the church, upon a platform with an upturned crescent moon, stands the statue of the Virgin. The face is dark in color, the eyes widely spaced and the traits somewhat aquiline.

About 20 inches (50 cm) tall, the statue was made by the Tarascan State of southern Mexico using an indigenous technique called titzingueni, in which a frame of wood is covered by a paste of corn pith and orchid juice, and then coated with gesso and painted. Similar statues are still venerated in other parts of Jalisco: Nuestra Señora de Los Altos (Our Lady of Los Altos) in the town of San Francisco de Asís, Atotonilco El Alto, Jalisco; Nuestra Señora de la Salud (Our Lady of Health) in Pátzcuaro; and the Virgin of Zapopan in the city of Guadalajara. Sometime in the late 16th or early 17th century the statue was modernized by being enclosed in a frame and draped with clothing. The Virgin's hands are joined in prayer, she has long brown hair, and wears a white gown and blue robe. The statue's body is covered with a golden crown in Byzantine style. Above the image are two angels of silver, supporting between them a silver banner with the Latin inscription in blue enamel: Mater Immaculata ora pro nobis (Immaculate Mother pray for us).

== Pilgrimages, festivals and churches ==
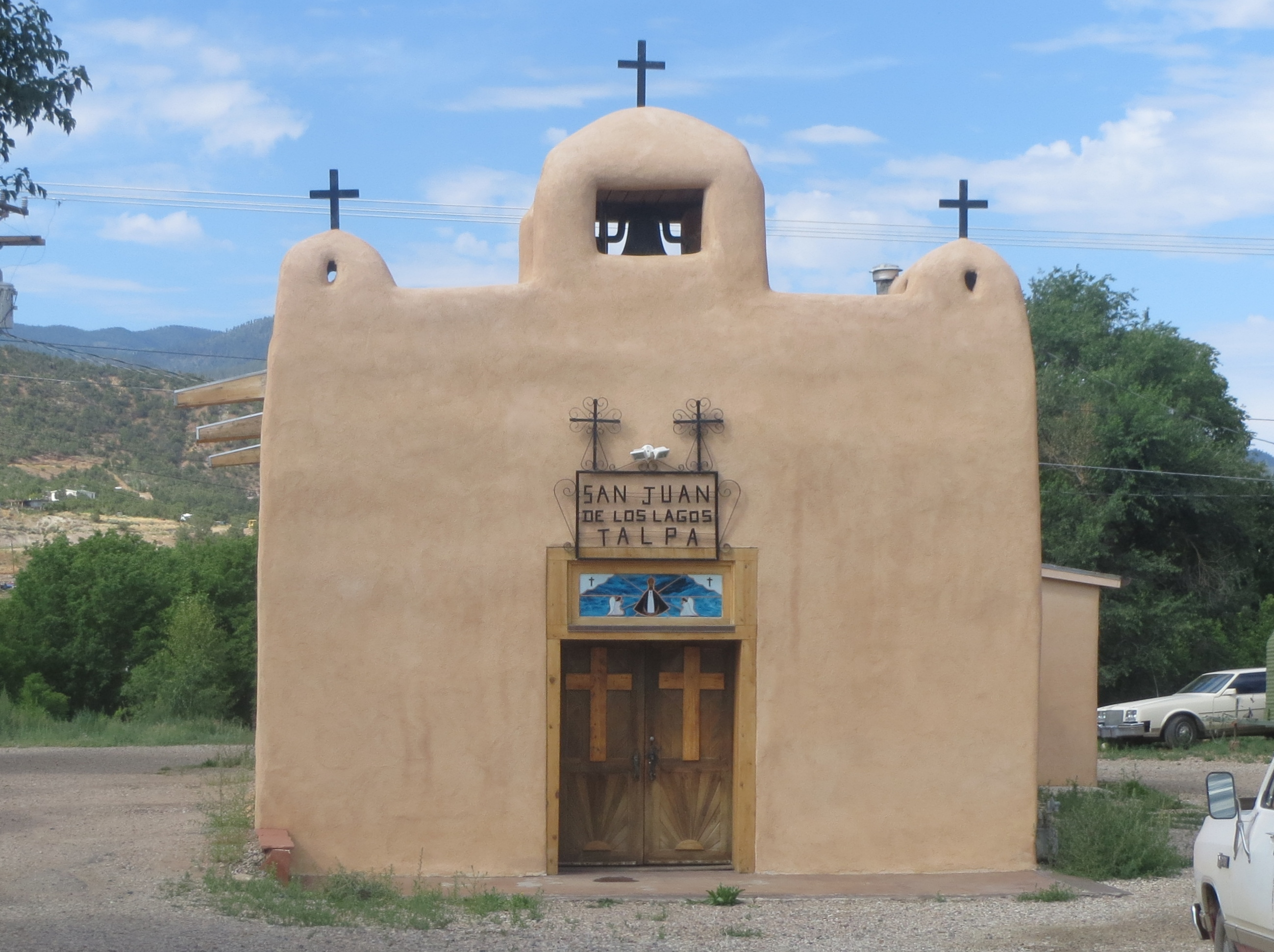
San Juan de los Lagos church in Talpa, New Mexico

This annual pilgrimage, occurring from late January into early February, transforms the shrine and its surrounding city, temporarily multiplying its population. More than a million people, many traveling on foot from across Mexico, participate in the week-long festivities. The atmosphere is marked by hundreds of temporary stalls selling religious icons, numerous bands playing music around the great basilica, and evening fireworks displays. For many, this spiritual gathering is also an expression of faith in practice: it is common for individuals to promise the Virgin they will make the pilgrimage if, for instance, a family member recovers from a serious illness or surgery.

In the 1950s, the devotion spread to the Rio Grande Valley of Texas. A reproduction of the Mexican image is housed in the Basilica of the National Shrine of Our Lady of San Juan del Valle in San Juan, Texas. This shrine is one of the largest Catholic sanctuaries in the state, and is known for its relationship with the migrant farm workers who still travel through this area of Texas.

The devotion carried over to California by people from Jalisco. In the 1970s, George Martinez revived the devotion in San Francisco, California, and a monthly Mass was celebrated. In 1979 Martinez convinced the bishop of San Juan to allow the statue to come to California, and the statue left Mexico for the first time ever in 1980.

The devotion also arrived in New Mexico and the church of Nuestra Senor de los Lagos was built in 1828 in Talpa, New Mexico.

Votive paintings for Our Lady of San Juan de los Lagos (Mexico) by anonymous from the Tropenmuseum Amsterdam

== See also ==
- Basilica of Our Lady of Zapopan
- Marian devotions
- Roman Catholic Diocese of San Juan de los Lagos
- Roman Catholic Marian art
- Virgin of El Rocío
- Basilica of the National Shrine of Our Lady of San Juan del Valle
