= Diocese of San Juan de los Lagos =

Roman Catholic diocese in Mexico

Diocese of San Juan de los Lagos Dioecesis Sancti Ioannis a Lacubus Diócesis de San Juan de los Lagos
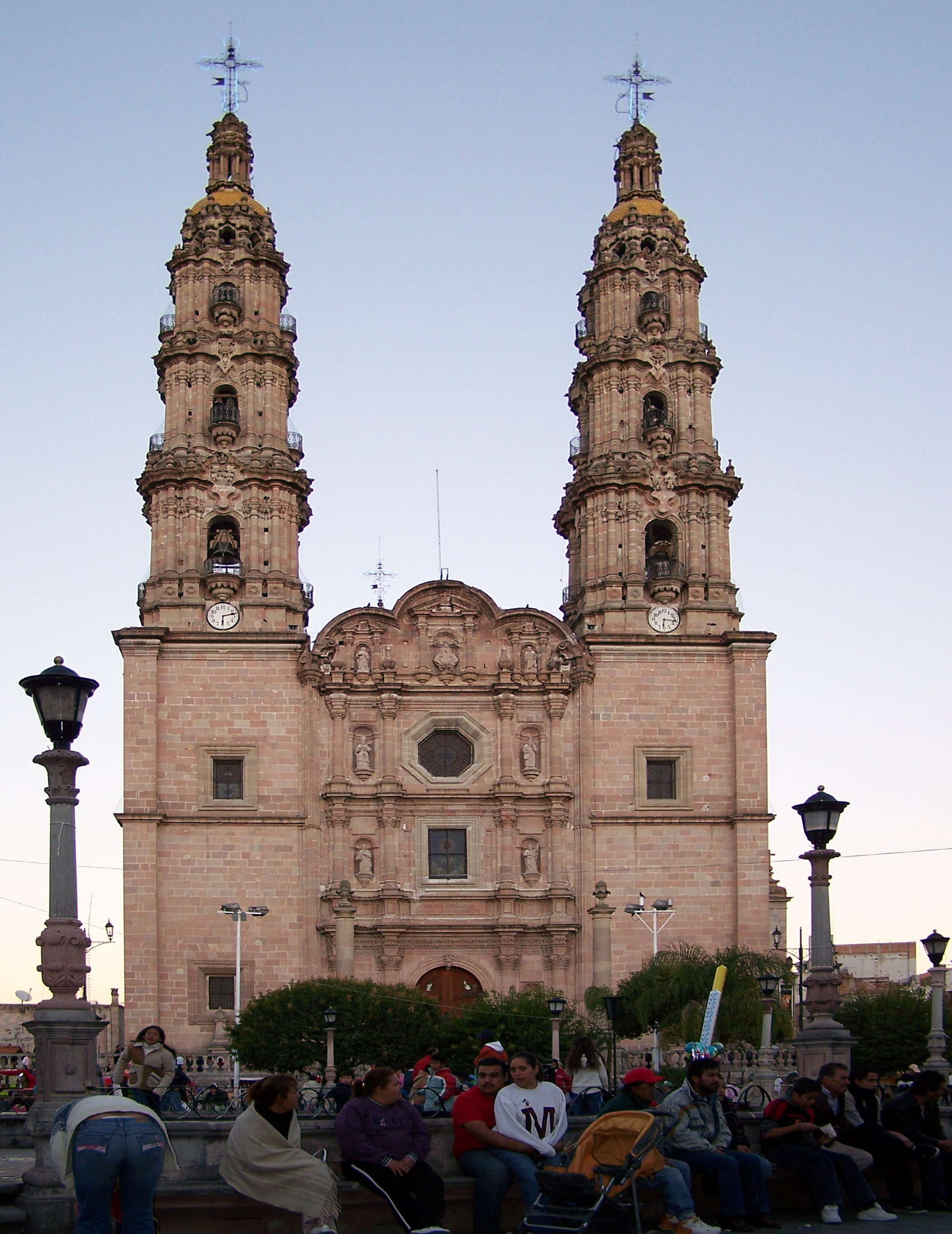
- Cathedral Basilica of Our Lady of San Juan de los Lagos

Location
- Country: Mexico
- Territory: State of Jalisco
- Ecclesiastical province: Archdiocese of Guadalajara
- Metropolitan: Francisco Robles Ortega

Statistics
- Population: Total; Catholics: (as of 2014); 1,115,000; 1,084,000 (97.2%)
- Parishes: 80

Information
- Denomination: Roman Catholic
- Rite: Roman Rite
- Established: January 25, 1941
- Cathedral: Cathedral Basilica of San Juan de los Lagos
- Patron saint: Our Lady of San Juan de los Lagos

Current leadership
- Pope: Leo XIV
- Bishop: José Leopoldo González González
- Bishops emeritus: Felipe Salazar Villagrana

Map
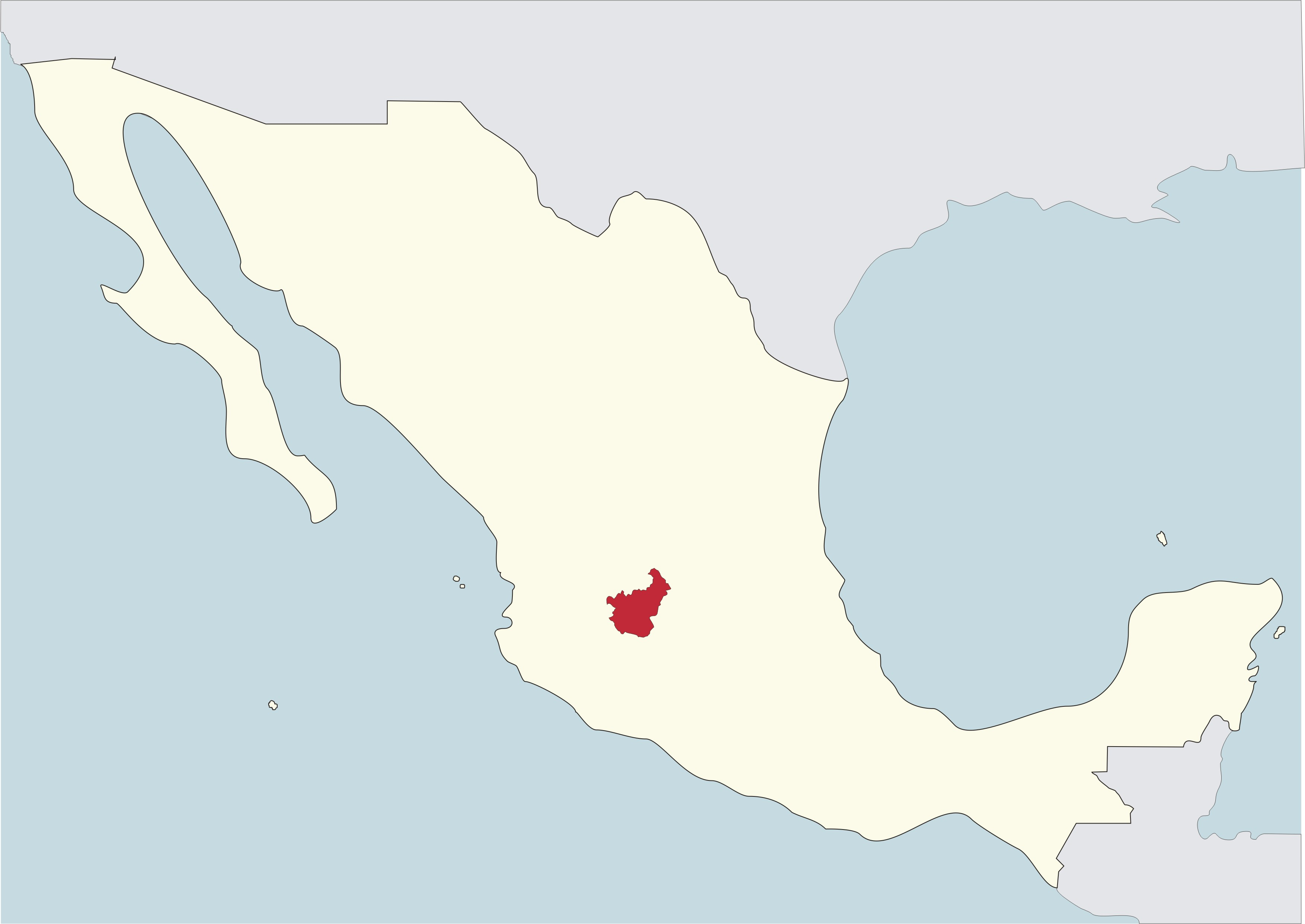

The Roman Catholic Diocese of San Juan de los Lagos (Latin: Dioecesis Sancti Ioannis a Lacubus) (erected 25 March 1972) is a suffragan diocese of the Archdiocese of Guadalajara. It encompasses some of the surrounding cities in the Mexican state of Jalisco, including Lagos de Moreno, Tepatitlán and Arandas. Since 25 May 2024, the Diocese has been led by Bishop José Leopoldo González González.

== Bishops ==
=== Ordinaries ===
- Francisco Javier Nuño y Guerrero (1972 – 1980); Archbishop (personal title)
- José López Lara (1981 – 1987)
- José Trinidad Sepúlveda Ruiz-Velasco (1988 – 1999)
- Javier Navarro Rodríguez (1999 – 2007), appointed Bishop of Zamora, Michoacán
- Felipe Salazar Villagrana (2008 – 2016)
- Jorge Alberto Cavazos Arizpe (2016 – 2022), appointed Archbishop of San Luis Potosí
- José Leopoldo González González (25 May 2024 – present)

=== Other priests of this diocese who became bishops ===
- José María de la Torre Martín, appointed Auxiliary Bishop of Guadalajara, Jalisco in 2002
- Juan Navarro Castellanos, appointed Auxiliary Bishop of Acapulco, Guerrero in 2004
- Raúl Gómez González, appointed Bishop of Tenancingo, México in 2009
- Pedro Vázquez Villalobos, appointed Bishop of Puerto Escondido, Oaxaca in 2012
- Gerardo Díaz Vázquez, appointed Bishop of Tacámbaro, Michoacán in 2014
- Cristóbal Ascencio García, appointed Bishop of Apatzingán, Michoacán in 2014
- Andrés Sáinz Márquez, appointed bishop prelate of Jesús María, Mexico in 2025

== External links and references ==
- "Diocese of San Juan de los Lagos". Catholic-Hierarchy.
