= San Julián, Jalisco =

San Julián
- Municipality and Town
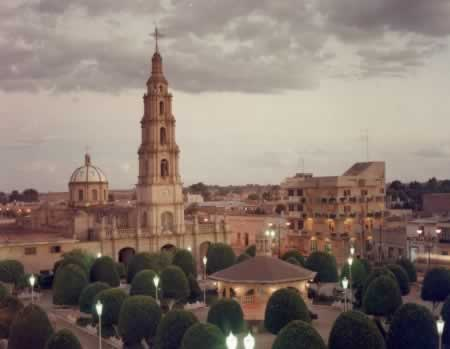
- Centro de San Julián

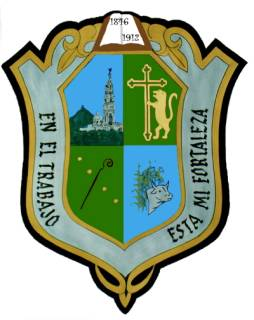
- Coat of arms

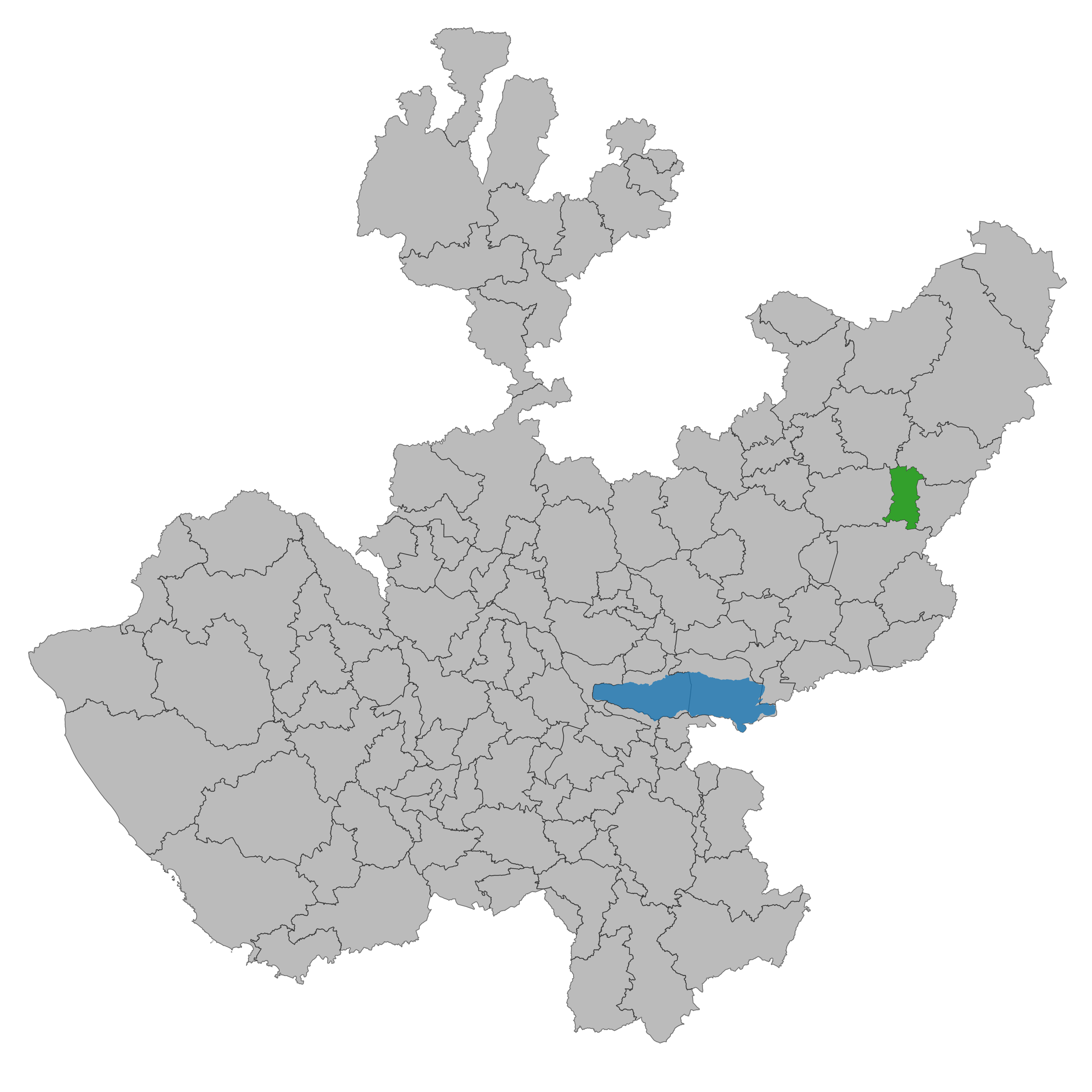
- Location of the municipality in Jalisco

- Location in Mexico
- Coordinates: 21°0′36.565″N 102°10′52.722″W
- Country: Mexico
- State: Jalisco

Area
  - Total: 261.9 km^{2} (101.1 sq mi)
  - Town: 7.39 km^{2} (2.85 sq mi)

Population (2020 census)
  - Total: 16,792
  - Density: 64.12/km^{2} (166.1/sq mi)
  - Town: 14,520
  - Town density: 1,960/km^{2} (5,090/sq mi)
- Time zone: UTC-6 (Central Standard Time)

San Julián is a town and a municipality, with a population of 16,792, in the Los Altos region of the Mexican state of Jalisco.

San Julian is a town and municipality of the state of Jalisco, Mexico. Located northeast of Jalisco, in the Southern Highlands Region, on a land area of 261.9 km^{2}. According to Count II of Population and Housing, the population is mainly engaged in the tertiary and secondary sectors of the economy. Nearly the whole population is Catholic. This devoutness of the religion led to the first armed uprising against the government, commanded by General Miguel Hernández. This uprising was the beginning of the Cristero War A consequence of this was martyred saint Julio Alvarez Mendoza who was tortured to death. The torture included acts such as walking on hot rocks after have the skin from the bottom of his foot cut off.

The main festivity is La Candelaria, celebrated each year on February 2, where revelers can attend carnivals, a certamen, dances, rodeos, theater, and some years, the circus. The carnivals last approximately two weeks. This includes multiple food stands, games with prizes, and a variety of entertaining rides.
