= Sierra de Amula Region =

- Region
- #7-Sierra de Amula Region
- Country: Mexico
- State: Jalisco
- Largest city: Autlán de Navarro

Area
  - Total: 5,844 km^{2} (2,256 sq mi)

Population (2020)
  - Total: 179,509
- Time zone: UTC−6 (CST)

The Sierra de Amula region is one of the regions of the Mexican state of Jalisco. It comprises 14 municipalities and had a population of 179,509 in 2020.

== Municipalities ==
Municipality code	Name	Population		Land area			Population density	
Municipality code	Name	2020	Rank	km^{2}	sq mi	Rank	2020	Rank
011	Atengo	5,599	9	532	205	4	11/km^{2} (27/sq mi)	12
015	Autlán de Navarro	64,931	1	685	264	2	95/km^{2} (246/sq mi)	2
017	Ayutla	12,880	5	939	363	1	14/km^{2} (36/sq mi)	10
032	Chiquilistlán	5,983	7	316	122	10	19/km^{2} (49/sq mi)	8
028	Cuautla	2,166	13	412	159	7	5/km^{2} (14/sq mi)	14
034	Ejutla	1,981	14	246	95	12	8/km^{2} (21/sq mi)	13
037	El Grullo	25,920	2	142	55	14	183/km^{2} (473/sq mi)	1
054	El Limón	5,368	12	190	73	13	28/km^{2} (73/sq mi)	4
052	Juchitlán	5,534	10	251	97	11	22/km^{2} (57/sq mi)	7
088	Tecolotlán	16,603	3	625	241	3	27/km^{2} (69/sq mi)	5
090	Tenamaxtlán	7,302	6	316	122	9	23/km^{2} (60/sq mi)	6
102	Tonaya	5,961	8	327	126	8	18/km^{2} (47/sq mi)	9
106	Tuxcacuesco	5,482	11	417	161	6	13/km^{2} (34/sq mi)	11
110	Unión de Tula	13,799	4	446	172	5	31/km^{2} (80/sq mi)	3
	Sierra de Amula Region	179,509	—	5,844	2,256.38	—	31/km^{2} (80/sq mi)	—
Source: INEGI

=== Largest cities ===
Largest cities or towns in Sierra de Amula Region Source:
Rank		Municipality	Pop.
1	Autlán de Navarro	Autlán de Navarro	52,019
2	El Grullo	El Grullo	22,738
3	Tecolotlán	Tecolotlán	9,688
4	Unión de Tula	Unión de Tula	9,529
5	Ayutla	Ayutla	7,469
6	Tenamaxtlán	Tenamaxtlán	4,940
7	Chiquilistlán	Chiquilistlán	4,299
8	Tonaya	Tonaya	3,706
9	Juchitlán	Juchitlán	3,528
10	El Limón	El Limón	3,125
