= 18th federal electoral district of Jalisco =

Federal electoral district of Mexico

Jalisco's 18th
- Electoral district of the Chamber of Deputies of Mexico

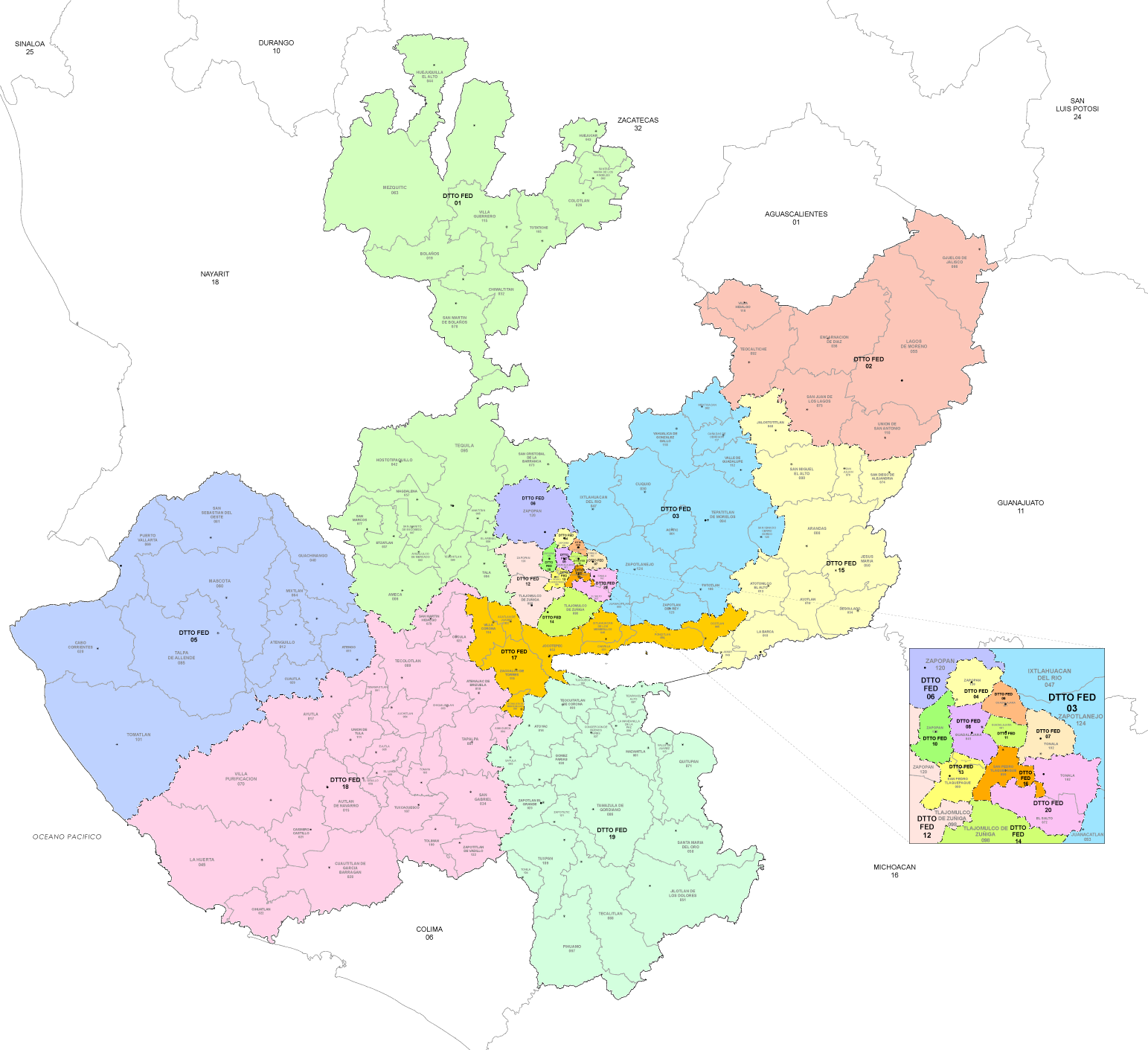
- 18th district

Incumbent
- Member: Haidyd Arreola López
- Party: ▌Morena
- Congress: 66th (2024–2027)

District
- State: Jalisco
- Head town: Autlán de Navarro
- Coordinates: 19°46′N 104°22′W
- Covers: 25 municipalities: Amacueca, Atemajac, Autlán, Ayutla, Casimiro Castillo, Cihuatlán, Cocula, Cuautitlán, Chiquilistlán, Ejutla, El Grullo, La Huerta, Juchitlán, El Limón, San Gabriel, San Martín Hidalgo, Tapalpa, Tecolotlán, Tenamaxtlán, Tolimán, Tonaya, Tuxcacuesco, Unión de Tula, Villa Purificación, Zapotitlán
- PR region: First
- Precincts: 261
- Population: 412,437 (2020 census)

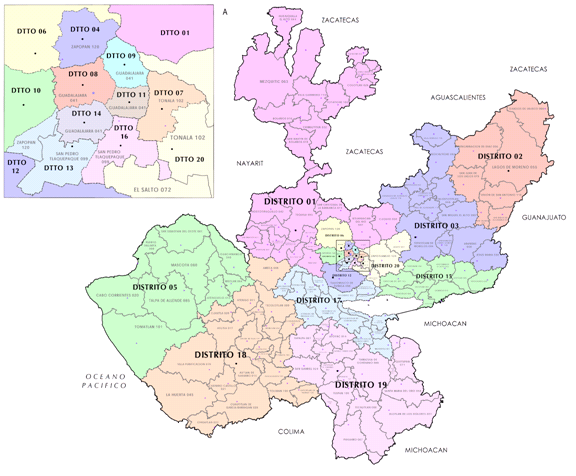
Jalisco's districts in 2017–2022

The 18th federal electoral district of Jalisco (Spanish: Distrito electoral federal 18 de Jalisco) is one of the 300 electoral districts into which Mexico is divided for elections to the federal Chamber of Deputies and one of 20 such districts in the state of Jalisco.

It elects one deputy to the lower house of Congress for each three-year legislative session by means of the first-past-the-post system. Votes cast in the district also count towards the calculation of proportional representation ("plurinominal") deputies elected from the first region.

Suspended in 1930, (Note: An amendment to Article 52 of the Constitution in 1928 changed the original provision of "one deputy per 60,000 inhabitants" to "one deputy per 100,000"; as a result, the size of the Chamber of Deputies fell from 281 in the 1928 election to 171 in 1934.) the 18th district was re-established as part of the 1977 electoral reforms. The restored district returned its first deputy in the 1979 mid-term election.

The current member for the district, elected in the 2024 general election, is Haidyd Arreola López of the National Regeneration Movement (Morena).

== District territory ==
Under the 2023 districting plan adopted by the National Electoral Institute (INE), which is to be used for the 2024, 2027 and 2030 federal elections, Jalisco's 18th district covers the south-west of the state, along the Pacific Ocean coast and the border with Colima, and comprises 261 electoral precincts (secciones electorales) across 25 of the state's 125 municipalities:

- Amacueca, Atemajac de Brizuela, Autlán de Navarro, Ayutla, Casimiro Castillo, Cihuatlán, Cocula, Cuautitlán de García Barragán, Chiquilistlán, Ejutla, El Grullo, La Huerta, Juchitlán, El Limón, San Gabriel, San Martín Hidalgo, Tapalpa, Tecolotlán, Tenamaxtlán, Tolimán, Tonaya, Tuxcacuesco, Unión de Tula, Villa Purificación and Zapotitlán de Vadillo.

The head town (cabecera distrital), where results from individual polling stations are gathered together and tallied, is the city of Autlán de Navarro. The district reported a population of 412,437 in the 2020 census.

== Previous districting schemes ==
Evolution of electoral district numbers
	1974	1978	1996	2005	2017	2023
Jalisco	13	20	19	19	20	20
Chamber of Deputies	196	300				

2017–2022

Jalisco regained its 20th congressional seat in the 2017 redistricting process. The 18th district's head town was at Autlán and it covered 22 municipalities:
- Ameca, Atengo, Autlán de Navarro, Ayutla, Casimiro Castillo, Cihuatlán, Cuautitlán de García Barragán, Cuautla, Chiquilistlán, Ejutla, El Grullo, El Limón, Juchitlán, La Huerta, Tecolotlán, Tenamaxtlán, Tolimán, Tonaya, Tuxcacuesco, Unión de Tula, Villa Purificación and Zapotitlán de Vadillo.

2005–2017

Under the 2005 plan, Jalisco had 19 districts. This district's head town was at Autlán and it covered 19 municipalities:
- Ameca, Atemajac de Brizuela, Autlán de Navarro, Casimiro Castillo, Cihuatlán, Cocula, Cuautitlán de García Barragán, Chiquilistlán, Ejutla, El Grullo, Juchitlán, El Limón, San Martín Hidalgo, Tecolotlán, Tenamaxtlán, Tonaya, Tuxcacuesco, Unión de Tula and Villa Corona.

1996–2005

In the 1996 scheme, under which Jalisco lost a single-member seat, the district had its head town at Autlán and it comprised 21 municipalities:
- Atengo, Autlán de Navarro, Ayutla, Casimiro Castillo, Cihuatlán, Cocula, Cuautitlán de García Barragán, Cuautla, Chiquilistlán, Ejutla, El Grullo, La Huerta, Juchitlán, El Limón, San Martín Hidalgo, Tecolotlán, Tenamaxtlán, Tonaya, Tuxcacuesco, Unión de Tula and Villa Purificación.

1978–1996

The districting scheme in force from 1978 to 1996 was the result of the 1977 electoral reforms, which increased the number of single-member seats in the Chamber of Deputies from 196 to 300. Under that plan, Jalisco's seat allocation rose from 13 to 20. The restored 18th district's head town was at Tlaquepaque and it covered the municipalities of El Salto, Tonalá and Tlaquepaque.

== Deputies returned to Congress ==
(Mexico) National parties
- Current
- PAN
- PRI
- PT
- PVEM
- MC
- Morena
- PAZ
- Somos
- Defunct or local only
- PLM
- PNR
- PRM
- PNM
- PP
- PPS
- PARM
- PFCRN
- CON
- PANAL
- PSD
- PES
- PES
- PRD

Jalisco's 18th district
Election	Deputy	Party	Term	Legislature
1916	Paulino Machorro y Narváez		1916–1917	Constituent Congress of Querétaro
1917	Basilio Vadillo		1917–1918	27th Congress
1918	Basilio Vadillo		1918–1920	28th Congress
1920	José Juan Ortega		1920–1922	29th Congress
1922	Paulino Manzano		1922–1924	30th Congress
1924	Felipe Pérez		1924–1926	31st Congress
1926	Ignacio H. Santana		1926–1928	32nd Congress
1928	Benigno Palencia		1928–1930	33rd Congress
The 18th district was suspended between 1930 and 1979
1979	Felipe López Prado	Institutional Revolutionary Party	1979–1982	51st Congress
1982	Alfredo Barba Hernández	Institutional Revolutionary Party	1982–1985	52nd Congress
1985	David Serrano Acosta	Institutional Revolutionary Party	1985–1988	53rd Congress
1988	Antonio Álvarez Esparza	Institutional Revolutionary Party	1988–1991	54th Congress
1991	Alfredo Barba Hernández	Institutional Revolutionary Party	1991–1994	55th Congress
1994	Hugo Fernando Rodríguez Martínez	Institutional Revolutionary Party	1994–1997	56th Congress
1997	Héctor Francisco Castañeda Jiménez	Institutional Revolutionary Party	1997–2000	57th Congress
2000	Marcelo García Morales	Institutional Revolutionary Party	2000–2003	58th Congress
2003	Javier Alejandro Galván Guerrero	Institutional Revolutionary Party	2003–2006	59th Congress
2006	José Nicolás Morales Ramos	National Action Party (Mexico)	2006–2009	60th Congress
2009	Carlos Luis Meillon Johnston	National Action Party (Mexico)	2009–2012	61st Congress
2012	Gabriel Gómez Michel (Note: Originally elected for the PVEM, Gómez Michel switched allegiance to the PRI on 4 September 2012. After he was abducted and murdered in September 2014, his seat was declared vacant on 23 September 2014 and he was replaced by Mestas Gallardo, his alternate, for the remainder of the congressional term.); Ignacio Mestas Gallardo	Ecologist Green Party of Mexico Institutional Revolutionary Party	2012–2015	62nd Congress
2015	Jesús Zúñiga Mendoza	Institutional Revolutionary Party	2015–2018	63rd Congress
2018	Mónica Almeida López	Party of the Democratic Revolution	2018–2021	64th Congress
2021	José Guadalupe Fletes Araiza (Note: Originally elected for the PRI, Fletes Araiza joined the Morena bloc in Congress on 12 March 2024.)	Institutional Revolutionary Party National Regeneration Movement	2021–2024	65th Congress
2024	Haidyd Arreola López	National Regeneration Movement	2024–2027	66th Congress

== Presidential elections ==
Jalisco's 18th district
Election	District won by	Party or coalition	%
2018	Andrés Manuel López Obrador	Juntos Haremos Historia	45.4026
2024	Claudia Sheinbaum Pardo	Sigamos Haciendo Historia	51.3103
