= El Limón, Jalisco =

El Limón
- Municipality and town
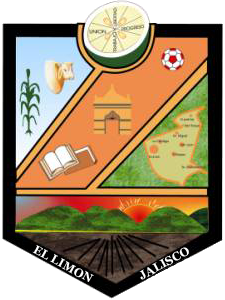
- Coat of arms

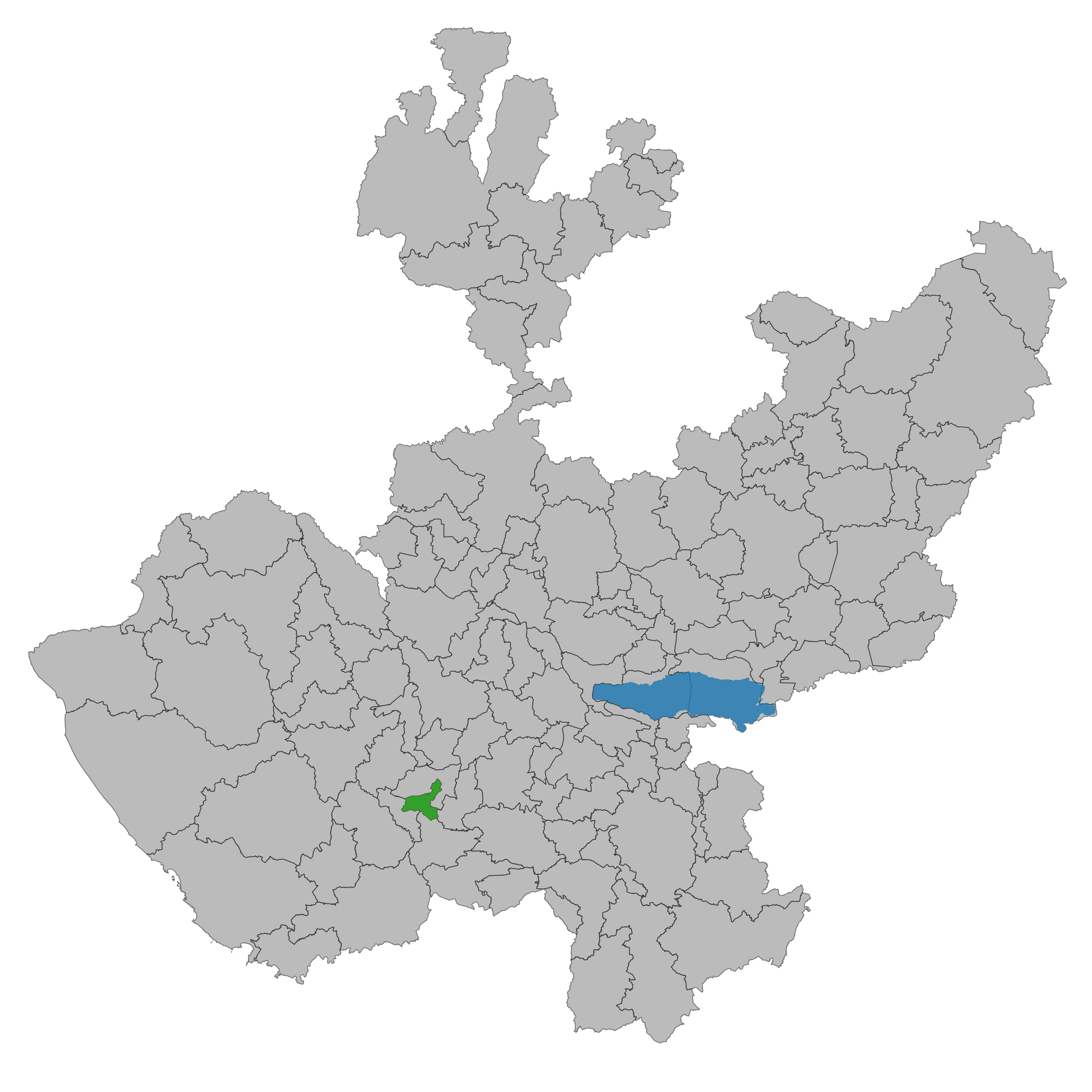
- Location of the municipality in Jalisco

- Location in Mexico
- Coordinates: 19°45′N 104°01′W
- Country: Mexico
- State: Jalisco

Area
  - Total: 114.2 km^{2} (44.1 sq mi)
  - Town: 2.72 km^{2} (1.05 sq mi)

Population (2020 census)
  - Total: 5,368
  - Density: 47.01/km^{2} (121.7/sq mi)
  - Town: 3,125
  - Town density: 1,150/km^{2} (2,980/sq mi)

El Limón is a town and municipality, in Jalisco in central-western Mexico. The municipality covers an area of 114.2 km^{2}.

In 2005, the municipality had a total population of 2,646.

== Toponymy ==
El Limón, previously known as Almolón and El Limón Nuevo, was a site in the old Zapotlán mountain range leading to Autlán.

== History ==
It was a site in the old mountain range of Zapotlán or Autlán. The Hacienda del Limón Viejo is very ancient. At the time of the Spanish conquest, San Juan de Amula was the main settlement, governed by a cacique. In October 1525, Captain Francisco Cortés de San Buenaventura, coming from Colima, stayed here and granted land to the indigenous people to form a community. The King of Spain granted them the title of town and large lands for an indigenous community.

Since 1526, these lands belonged to the province of Martín Monje and Pedro Gómez, with Tenamaxtlán as its head, later annexed to Autlán. In December 1817, Limón Viejo was depopulated. On January 8, 1818, landowners, laborers, and ranchers moved to Limón Nuevo, a livestock estate of the old hacienda. They settled there to benefit from the royal road and the large springs. Landowner Juan Vicente Rosales died intestate in 1843, and his descendants continued to own this inheritance jointly until the formation of the ejidos of El Limón and La Ciénega, with several owners over the years.

In 1909, one of its owners, Mr. Vidal Zepeda, established the hacienda's main house in what is now a neighborhood of La Ciénega. Pedro Zamora, a Villista general born in El Palmar de los Pelayo near El Limón, roamed the region for ten years. This guerrilla fighter became a legendary figure still remembered by many locals.

El Limón was established as a municipality on June 2, according to decree number 2069, signed by Governor Basilio Vadillo. The initiative was due to some residents and the support of Deputy Rodrigo Camacho.

== Geographic Description ==
=== Location ===
The municipality of El Limón is located in the Sierra de Amula region of Jalisco. It borders the municipalities of Ejutla, El Grullo, Tonaya, and Tuxcacuesco. It covers an area of 190.49 square kilometers.

The municipality borders Ejutla to the north; Tonaya to the east; Tuxcacuesco and El Grullo to the south; and El Grullo and Ejutla to the west.

=== Physical Environment ===
42.5% of the municipality is mountainous, with slopes greater than 15°, and the predominant rock is limestone (24.2%), a chemical or biochemical sedimentary rock, the most important of carbonate rocks. The predominant soil is lithosol (43.5%), a stony soil, the most abundant in the country. It is found in all climates and with diverse vegetation. The jungle (57.9%) is the dominant land use in the municipality.

=== Hydrography ===
The water resources of the municipality consist of groundwater, rivers, and lakes. The territory is located within one aquifer, with 0% having no availability and 100.0% having groundwater availability.

The municipal territory is within the Canoas, Corcovado, El Rosario, and Las Piedras basins, with 100.0% having surface water availability and 0% having a deficit.

Its hydrological resources are provided by rivers and streams forming the Ameca River basin, part of the Pacific Central region. Its main river is the Tuxcacueco, crossing the territory to the west; it also has streams: Salado, Hondo, Las Piletas, and Grande; several springs; and the Basilio Vadillo Dam (Las Piedras). The Basilio Vadillo Dam (Las Piedras) is not part of El Limón Municipality; it is located in Ejutla, Jalisco.

=== Climate, Temperature, and Precipitation ===
Most of El Limón (94.1%) has a warm sub-humid climate. The average annual temperature is 23.2°C, with average highs and lows of 34.7°C and 11.8°C, respectively. The average annual precipitation is 871mm. The rainy season occurs in June, July, and August. Wind direction is variable with constant intensity.

== Protected Natural Areas ==
El Limón has 0.01% wetlands with no designated protected natural areas.

== Drought ==
At the municipal level, extreme drought is the most widespread at 53.6%, followed by exceptional, severe, and moderate drought at 20%, 11%, and 9%, respectively.

== Flora and Fauna ==
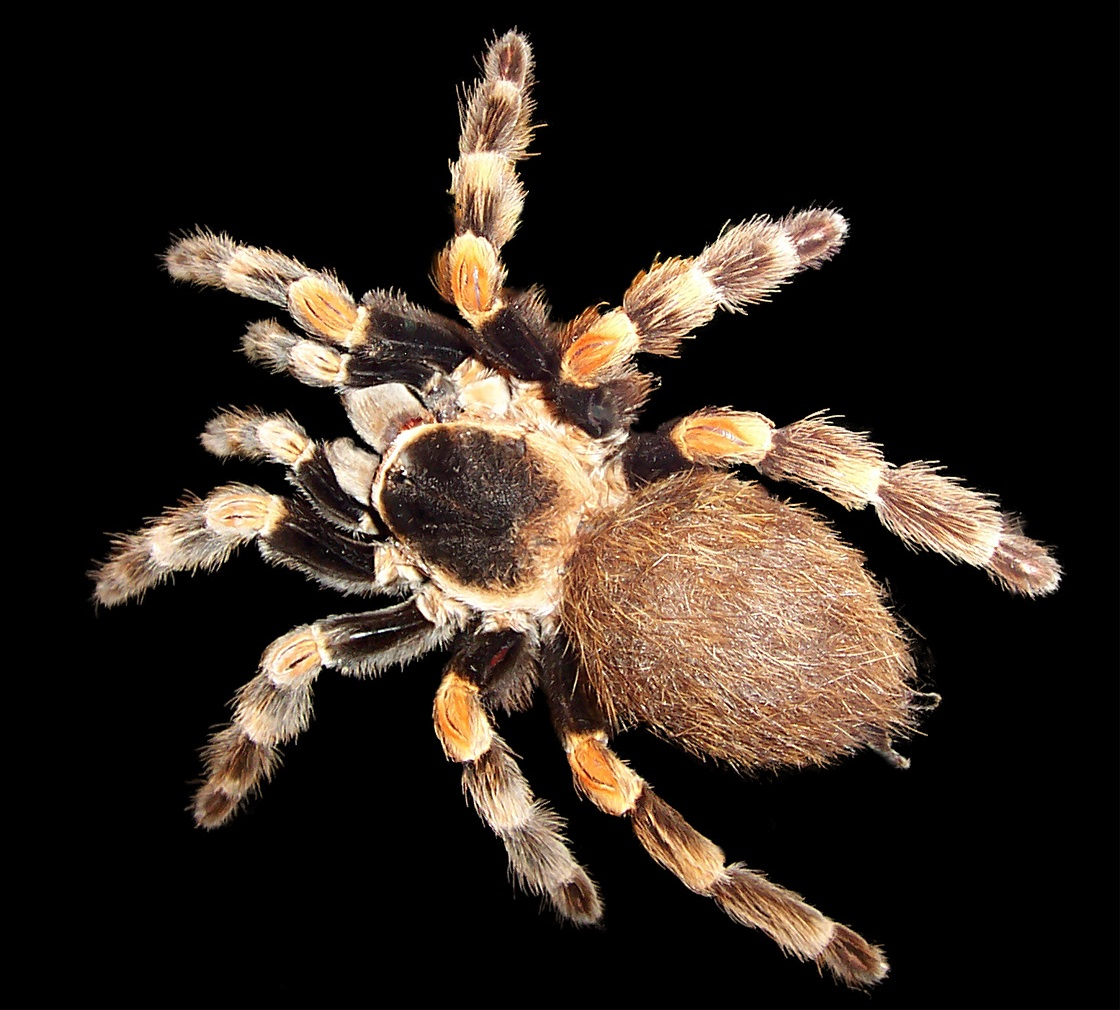
Tarantulas are present in the municipality.

The vegetation includes oak, pine, parota, mesquite, guamúchil, cactus, huizache, and palm trees in some areas.

The fauna includes species such as deer, coyote, hare, skunk, badger, tarantulas, opossum, some reptiles, and birds like quail and güilota. Also present are the onza (a small feline), puma, Mexican tigrillo, black panther, and Gila monster.

== Infrastructure ==
The municipality has 16 public services, including 24 schools, 13 sports or recreational facilities, and 9 plazas.

=== Health ===
According to health ministry records, the municipality has 4 health service units, including clinics, general and specialized hospitals, administrative offices, pharmacies, laboratories, family medicine units, medical specialties, and mobile units. Of these, 4 belong to the Health Secretariat (SSJ), 1 to the Mexican Social Security Institute (IMSS), and 1 to the Institute of Social Security and Services for State Workers (ISSSTE).

== Demographics and Localities ==
According to the 2020 Population and Housing Census, the population was 5,368; 49.7% male and 50.3% female. Compared to 2015 (5,379 inhabitants), the municipal population decreased by 0.2% in five years.

=== Localities ===
In 2020, El Limón had 11 localities, with 1 having two houses and 2 having one. El Limón was the most populated, with 3,125 people, representing 58.2% of the municipal population; followed by La Ciénega (16.7%), San Juan de Amula (9.6%), San Miguel Hidalgo (6.8%), and El Palmar de San Antonio (3.8%).

== Migration ==
The migration intensity index was 60.24, indicating a high level of migration.

== Poverty by Social Deprivation ==
Regarding social deprivation in 2020, the indicator for lack of access to social security was the highest at 59.6%, representing 3,215 inhabitants. In contrast, the lowest was lack of access to food at 3.2%. Other indicators like educational lag, access to health services, access to basic housing services, and access to food represented 20%, 11%, 5%, and 3%, respectively.

== Economy and Employment ==
According to the National Statistical Directory of Economic Units (DENUE) by INEGI, El Limón had 195 economic units as of May 2024, with a predominance of service establishments at 48.72% of the total.

=== Employment ===
By June 2024, IMSS reported 162 insured workers, showing a constant number compared to June 2023. The economic group with the most jobs was Public Administration and Social Security Services, with 64 workers (39.51% of total insured). The second group was Fishing, with 26 insured workers (16.05%). The third group was Food, Beverage, and Tobacco Retail, with 11%.

== Municipal Development Index (IDM) ==
El Limón has a Low institutional development with an IDM-I of 48.

== Monthly Average of Investigation Files ==
From June 2023 to May 2024, 45 investigation files were opened, with a monthly average of 4, with the most investigated crime being negligent injuries.

== Tourism ==
=== Architecture ===
- Hacienda del Realito.

=== Churches ===
- Templo de San Juan.

=== Parks and Reserves ===
- Cerro del Narigón.
- Cerro de La Capilla.
- Cerro de Las Tarjeas.

=== Dams and Springs ===
- Arroyo de Las Piletas.
- Manantial Las Higueras.
- Presa de Luis.
- El Salto (in La Ciénega).
- El Agua Caliente (Hot Springs, in La Ciénega).

== Festivals ==
=== Civic Festivals ===
- Bullfighting Festival. From December 31 to January 13.

=== Religious Festivals ===
- Festival in honor of the Immaculate Conception from November 30 to December 8.
- Festival in honor of Virgin of Guadalupe from December 12.
- Festival in honor of the Sacred Heart of Jesus.

== Primary Information Sources ==
Instituto de Información Estadística y Geográfica del Estado de Jalisco (2024). Municipal Diagnosis of El Limón: October 2024. At https://iieg.gob.mx/ns/wp-content/uploads/2024/10/El-Lim%C3%B3n.pdf Retrieved on October 29, 2024, from https://iieg.gob.mx/ns/?page_id=21707
