= Autlán, New Spain =

Autlan was a corregidor and alcaldia mayor of New Spain. It had its capital at what is now Autlán, Jalisco, but stretched southward to the coast at Puerto de la Navidad and northward into the interior as far as Ameca, Jalisco.

This area was inhabited by many diverse people prior to the Spanish incursion. Among them were speakers of Western Otomi languages, Bapame, Auteco, Cuyoteco, Otontlatolli, Cazcan and Totonac. At the time of the Spanish incursion the area was divided between the states of Ahuacapan, Ameca, Apimila-Coyutla, Aohtlan, Atenco, Axotla, Ayaoquila, Ayotitlan, Ayotlan (with vassal territories at Tlepantequipa and Tenamaxtlan), Chipiltitlan, Cichuatlan, Cuetzalan, Epatalan (with vassal domains at Tetlixtla and Tzoquitlan), Instlichanga, Ixtlahuacan, Maloastla, Milpa (vassal domains at Aohtlan and Tlacapatlan), Mixtlan, Nocheztlan, Ocuiltepec, Tequecistalan (vassal domain at Acautlan), Tenamaxtlan, Tecolotla, Tecuxuacan, Teutlichanga (vassal domain at Tomatlan), Tlacaltexcal (vassal domains at Acapangal, Cuitlatlan and Zacapala), Tlacanahuac, Tlaquexpan, Tlilan, Xalipanga, Xiquitlan and Xonacatlan.

The Spanish captured all these states in 1523-1524. The corrigemento was established in 1534. For a short time Ameca and Tenamastlan were separate alcaldia mayores, then for a few years after 1601 a joint alcaldia mayor, but then they were united with this domain.

== Sources ==
- Gerhard, Peter. Guide to the Historical Geography of New Spain. Camidge: University Press, 1972. p. 58-61.
