= Nuestra Belleza Jalisco 2011 =

- Date: July 19, 2012
- Venue: Teatro Diana, Guadalajara, Jalisco
- Broadcaster: Televisa Guadalajara, Canal 4
- Entrants: 11
- Placements: 5
- Winner: TBD

Nuestra Belleza Jalisco 2012, will be held at the Teatro Diana in Guadalajara, Jalisco on July 19, 2012. At the conclusion of the final night of competition, Lucia Silva of Puerto Vallarta will crown her successor.

== Contestants ==
Hometown	Contestant	Age	Height (m)
Guadalajara	Ana Karen Siordia Velasco	22	1.74
Ciudad Guzmán	Cinthia Analí Hernández Flores	22	1.75
Tlajomulco de Zúñiga	Emma Villegas Vázquez	20	1.73
Puerto Vallarta	Erika Rubit Rivera Cáceres	22	1.74
Guadalajara	Haydée del Carmen Vizcaíno Moreno	21	1.73
Zapotlanejo	Jacqueline Alejandra Morales Pérez	22	1.75
Tenamaxtlán	Jackeline Jiménez García	22	1.74
Guadalajara	Julieta Viridiana Villalobos De Lira	19	1.72
Guadalajara	Kenya Renné Corona Villareal	22	1.70
Autlán de Navarro	Laura Aracely Pérez López	20	1.73
Guadalajara	Mónica Elizabeth Román Castillo	21	1.78
