= Javier Galván =

Mexican politician (1966–2015)

- Born: 9 August 1966; Jalisco, Mexico
- Died: 19 June 2015 (aged 48); Guadalajara, Jalisco
- Occupation: Politician
- Political party: PRI
- Spouse: Isabela Valencia
- Children: Javier Galván Valencia, Diana Galván Valencia, Valentina Galván Valencia

Javier Alejandro Galván Guerrero (9 August 1966 – 19 June 2015) was a Mexican politician affiliated with the Institutional Revolutionary Party (PRI).

In the 2003 mid-terms, he was elected to the Chamber of Deputies to represent Jalisco's 18th district during the 59th session of Congress.

He also served two terms in the Congress of Jalisco, as the president of the PRI in Jalisco, and as the municipal president of Autlán de Navarro, Jalisco. At the time of his death, he was the state delegate of the Institute for Social Security and Services for State Workers (ISSSTE).

He was shot dead in his vehicle in Guadalajara, Jalisco, on 19 June 2015. He was the 103rd public servant murdered during the administration of Governor Aristóteles Sandoval.

== Family ==
Galván Guerrero was the grandson of Gen. Marcelino García Barragán and the nephew of Javier García Paniagua.
