= Gabriel Gómez Michel =

Mexican politician (1965–2014)

- Born: 24 March 1965; Jalisco, Mexico
- Died: 22 or 23 September 2014 (aged 49); Zacatecas, Mexico
- Education: University of Guadalajara
- Occupations: Paediatrician, politician
- Political party: PRI
- Spouse: Unknown
- Children: Unknown
- Relatives: Unknown

Gabriel Gómez Michel (24 March 1965 – 22 or 23 September 2014) was a Mexican paediatrician, academic, and politician affiliated with the Institutional Revolutionary Party (PRI).

From 2010 to 2012, he was the municipal president of El Grullo, Jalisco. In the 2012 general election, he was elected to the Chamber of Deputies to represent Jalisco's 18th district during the 62nd session of Congress (2012–2015).

Gómez was kidnapped in the Guadalajara Metropolitan Area on 22 September 2014. His body was found on the Jalisco–Zacatecas border on 23 September.
