= Ayotlan =

Ayotlan may refer to:

- Ayotlán, a municipality in Jalisco.
- Ayotlan (state) a pre-Spanish state in Mexico.
