= Jalisco flood =

Flood in Mexico in 2023

- English name: Autlán de Navarro floods
- Type: Flood
- Cause: Heavy rain across Jalisco
- Deaths: 8
- Injuries: 3
- Missing: 9
- Property damage: 5 homes, 1 school, several roads
- Displaced: 200+

The Jalisco flood, locally referred to as the Autlán de Navarro flood, was a devastating inundation that struck the region of Autlán de Navarro in the Mexican state of Jalisco. This flood, which began on September 25, 2023, at approximately 7:20 AM, was a result of heavy and relentless rainfall across Autlán de Navarro and its surrounding areas.

== Event ==
On September 25, 2023, the small community of about 200 inhabitants of Autlán de Navarro in Jalisco, Mexico was devastated by flash flooding. The flooding was triggered by a sudden rise of the El Jalocote stream. The surge resulted in eight confirmed deaths, three missing persons, and significant property damage. Five houses, a school, and multiple roads were also damaged. With the aid of search and rescue dogs, drones, and a medical helicopter, firefighters and emergency responders are still in progress to find the remaining missing people.

Heavy deforestation and a fire that occurred earlier in the year combined with unusually high rainfall in the region may have impacted the wooded area around the stream and contributed to the severity of the flash flooding event, although this connection has not been definitively proven.
