= List of municipal presidents of Autlán =

Following is a list of municipal presidents of Autlán, in the Mexican state of Jalisco

Municipal president	Term	Political party	Notes
Roberto Blake Arias	01-01-1915–07-03-1915		
Miguel Valencia Jiménez	1915		
Ramón Yáñez Bravo			
Manuel Cosío González			
Antonio García Michel			
Carlos Pelayo Alcocer			
Jesús G. Ibarra			
Florencio Topete Valencia			
Irineo Barragán Blake			
Higinio García Meza			
Domingo Pérez Michel			
J. Matilde Castañeda E.			
José Rochín			
Serapio G. Hurtado			
Severo Lepe			
Alfonso A. Villaseñor			
Juan R. Martínez			
Víctor R. Hurtado			
Heliodoro Ruvalcaba			
Adolfo G. Castellanos			
Enrique Godínez G.			
Luis Velázquez B.			
Alfredo Cuéllar Castillo			
Gildardo Michel García			
Jaime Llamas García			
Felipe Uribe Adame			
Flavio Fierro Serrano			
Serapio Ortega			
José Ramírez Muñoz			
J. Guadalupe Zamora			
Ponciano Ponce González			
Clemente Nuño G.			
Juan González Radillo			
J. Jesús Ochoa Ruiz			
Alfonso Pelayo Alcocer			
Ramón Morán Meda			
Román Salazar Ruiz			
Héctor Topete Valencia			
J. Concepción Hernández R.			
Francisco Espinosa S.			
Antonio Orozco Parra			
J. Ángel Pérez Gómez			
Aureliano Guzmán López			
Leopoldo Godoy Cisneros			
Enrique Espinoza Méndez			
J. Jesús Velázquez Gómez			
Salvador Robles Alcaraz			
Heriberto Corona Estrada			
J. Carmen Villalvazo González			
Gustavo Villaseñor García			
Carlos Benavides B.			
Gabriel Lima Velázquez			
Gustavo Villaseñor García			
Rafael Saray Enríquez	1982–1985	PRI	
Fausto Gutiérrez Lugo	1985–1988	PRI	
Francisco Javier Gómez Díaz	1988–1991	PRI	Applied for a leave
Olimpia Ramírez Camacho	1991-1992	PRI	Acting municipal president
Francisco Julián Íñiguez García	31-03-1992–1995	PRI	Applied for a leave
José Luis Araiza Zárate	1995	PRI	Acting municipal president
Felipe Rivera Pelayo	31-03-1995–31-12-1997	PAN	
Javier Alejandro Galván Guerrero	01-01-1998–31-12-2000	PRI	
Armando Pérez Olivia	01-01-2001–2003	PRI	
Alejandro Parra Gutiérrez	2003	PRI	Acting municipal president
Carlos Meillón Johnston	01-01-2004–2006	PAN	
Francisco Espinosa Peña	2006	PAN	Acting municipal president
Francisco Fernando Guerrero Moreno	01-01-2007–31-12-2009	PAN	
Fernando Morán Guzmán	01-01-2010–30-09-2012	PAN	
Salvador Álvarez García	01-10-2012–30-09-2015	PT; MC	Coalition "Alianza Progresista por México" (Progressive Alliance for Mexico)
Fabricio Israel Corona Vizcarra	01-10-2015–30-09-2018	PRI; PVEM	
Miguel Ángel Íñiguez Brambila	01-10-2018–30-09-2021	PT; Morena; PES	Coalition "Juntos Haremos Historia" (Together We Will Make History)
Gustavo Salvador Robles Martínez	01-10-2021–01-03-2024	PRI	Applied for a leave, in order to seek reelection
Dagoberto Trujillo Hernández	01-03-2024–03-06-2024	PRI	Acting municipal president
Gustavo Salvador Robles Martínez	04-06-2024–30-09-2024	PRI	Resumed, to finish his first triennium
Gustavo Salvador Robles Martínez	01-10-2024–	PAN; PRI; PRD	Coalition "Fuerza y Corazón por México" (Strength and Heart for Mexico). He was reelected
