= Jesús Zúñiga =

Mexican farmer and politician (1947–2022)

Member of the Chamber of Deputies
- In office 1 September 2015 – 31 August 2018
- Preceded by: Ignacio Mestas Gallardo
- Succeeded by: Mónica Almeida López
- Constituency: Jalisco's 18th district

Mayor of Unión de Tula
- In office 1987–1988
- Preceded by: José Antonio Andrade Moreno
- Succeeded by: Pedro Campos Ramírez

Personal details
- Born: Jesús Zúñiga Mendoza; 15 April 1947; El Chante, Jalisco, Mexico
- Died: 7 March 2022 (aged 74); El Chante, Jalisco, Mexico
- Cause of death: Murder
- Political party: PRI
- Occupation: Farmer

Jesús Zúñiga Mendoza (15 April 1947 – 7 March 2022) was a Mexican farmer and politician. A member of the Institutional Revolutionary Party (PRI), he served in the Chamber of Deputies from 2015 to 2018, representing Jalisco's 18th district. Zúñiga was found murdered at his ranch in El Chante, Autlán de Navarro, on 7 March 2022, at the age of 74.
