= José Nicolás Morales Ramos =

Mexican politician (born 1959)

- Born: 8 July 1959 (age 66); Cuautla, Jalisco, Mexico
- Occupation: Politician
- Political party: PAN

José Nicolás Morales Ramos (born 8 July 1959) is a Mexican politician affiliated with the National Action Party (PAN). In the 2006 general election, he was elected to the Chamber of Deputies to represent Jalisco's 18th district during the 60th session of Congress.
