= Marcelo García Morales =

Mexican politician (born 1969)

- Born: 10 March 1969 (age 57); Guadalajara, Jalisco, Mexico
- Occupation: Politician
- Political party: PRI

Marcelo García Morales (born 10 March 1969) is a Mexican politician from the Institutional Revolutionary Party (PRI). In the 2000 general election, he was elected to the Chamber of Deputies to represent Jalisco's 18th district during the 58th session of Congress.
