= San Miguel de la Sierra =

Location in Jalisco, Mexico

Coordinates: 20°05′35″N 104°36′12″W

San Miguel de la Sierra is in the municipality of Ayutla, Jalisco, Mexico. On 2 April 2011, its elevation was measured at 2,113 meters above sea level.
