= Auteco language =

Nahua language of Jalisco, Mexico

Auteco Nahuatl
- Native to: Jalisco
- Region: Autlán
- Era: Colonial
- Language family: Uto-Aztecan: Aztecan (Nahuan); Nahuatl; Auteco Nahuatl
- Writing system: Latin

Language codes
- ISO 639-3: None (mis)
- Glottolog: None

Auteco was a Nahuan language spoken in the Milpa valley area of Jalisco prior to the coming of the Spanish. It is now extinct.

== Sources ==
- Gerhard, Peter. Guide to the Historical Geography of New Spain. Cambridge: University Press, 1972. p. 58.
