= Carlos Luis Meillón Johnston =

Mexican politician (born 1951)

- Born: 24 January 1951 (age 75); Manzanillo, Colima, Mexico
- Occupation: Politician
- Political party: PAN

Carlos Luis Meillón Johnston (born 24 January 1951) is a Mexican politician from the National Action Party (PAN). In the 2009 mid-terms, he was elected to the Chamber of Deputies to represent Jalisco's 18th district during the 61st session of Congress.
