= Ayotlan (state) =

Former state in El Grullo, Mexico

Ayotlan was a state located along the upper reaches of the Armeria River in the general vicinity of El Grullo in Jalisco. It should not be confused with the municipality of the same name that is in Jalisco which is significantly further east.

Ayotlan was a state prior to the Spanish incursion which had tributary states at Tlepantequipa and Tlaquitetequi. It was conquered by the Spanish in 1525. After this it was incorporated into the domain of Autlan.

== Sources ==
- Gerhard, Peter. Guide to the Historical Geography of New Spain. Cambridge: University Press, 1972. p. 59.
