= Basilio Vadillo =

Mexican politician (1885–1935)

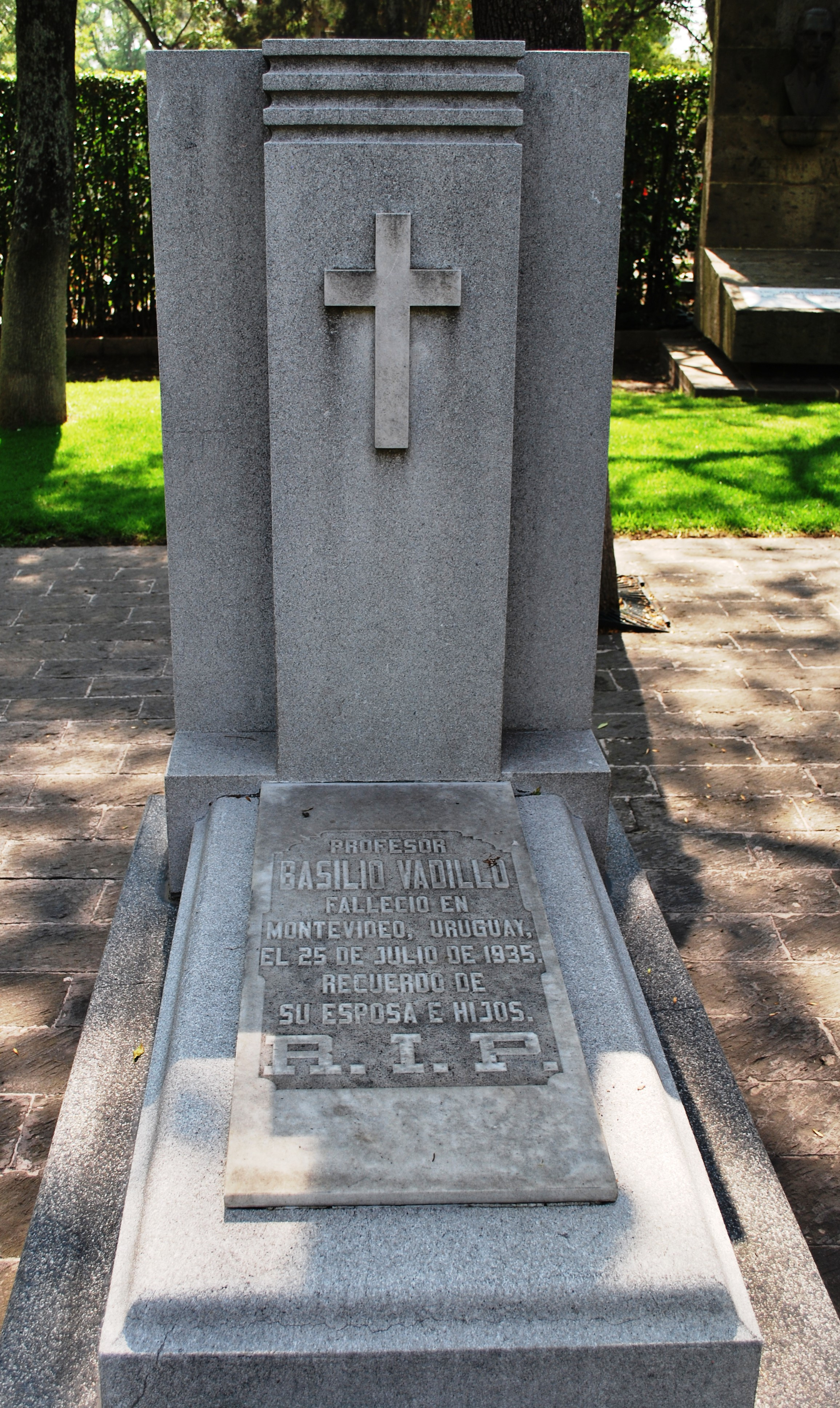
BasilioVadillotombDoloresDF

Basilio Vadillo (14 July 1885 – 26 July 1935) was an educator and politician who served briefly as governor of the Mexican state of Jalisco (1921–22).

He was born in Zapotitlán, Jalisco, (since renamed Zapotitlán de Vadillo) and as a young boy moved to Colima. He worked as a teacher in Colima and served as the director of the Ramón R. de la Vega school. After Victoriano Huerta's 1913 coup (overthrowing Madero's government), Vadillo joined a group of students from Colima to fight at Mazatlán on the side of the revolutionaries trying to end Huerta's dictatorship.

In 1917 he founded the Mixed Normal School of Colima to provide a way for the youth of Colima an easier access to teaching careers.

After the success of the revolution, Vadillo served as editor of a number of revolutionary periodicals, eventually serving as Álvaro Obregón's publicist, editing the Obregonist publication The Republican Monitor. He served in the Chamber of Deputies for Jalisco's 18th district from 1917 to 1920, as governor of Jalisco from 1921 to 1922, and as president of the Partido Nacional Revolucionario (the forerunner of the modern PRI).

During his tenure as governor of Jalisco, Vadillo signed the communal land grant for the city of Puerto Vallarta. The city later honored him by naming a street in the Olas Altas area after him. Ca. Basilio Vadillo is known for its numerous restaurants.

Basilio Vadillo is interred in Guadalajara at the Rotunda de los Hombres Ilustres.
