= Juchitlán =

Juchitlán, Jalico
- Municipality and town
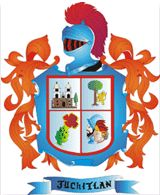
- Coat of arms

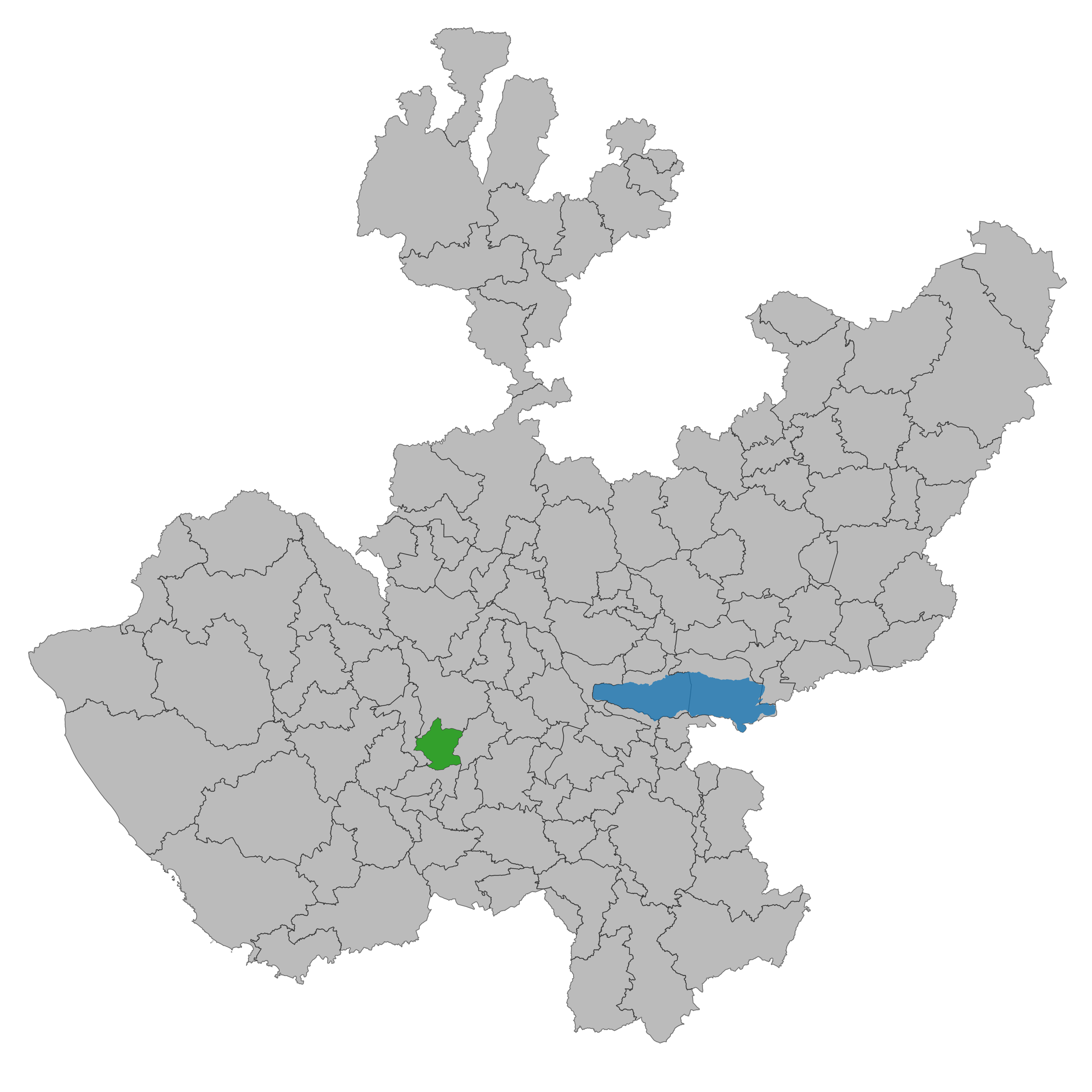
- Location of the municipality in Jalisco

- Location in Mexico
- Coordinates: 20°04′59.07″N 104°06′00.35″W
- Country: Mexico
- State: Jalisco

Area
  - Total: 245.9 km^{2} (94.9 sq mi)
  - Town: 1.79 km^{2} (0.69 sq mi)

Population (2020 census)
  - Total: 5,534
  - Density: 22.51/km^{2} (58.29/sq mi)
  - Town: 3,528
  - Town density: 1,970/km^{2} (5,100/sq mi)
- Time zone: UTC-6 (Central Standard Time)

Juchitlán is a town and municipality, in Jalisco in central-western Mexico. The municipality covers an area of 245.9 km^{2}.

As of 2005, the municipality had a total population of 5,282.
