= Unión de Tula =

- Municipality and town
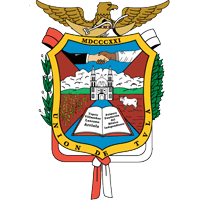
- Coat of arms

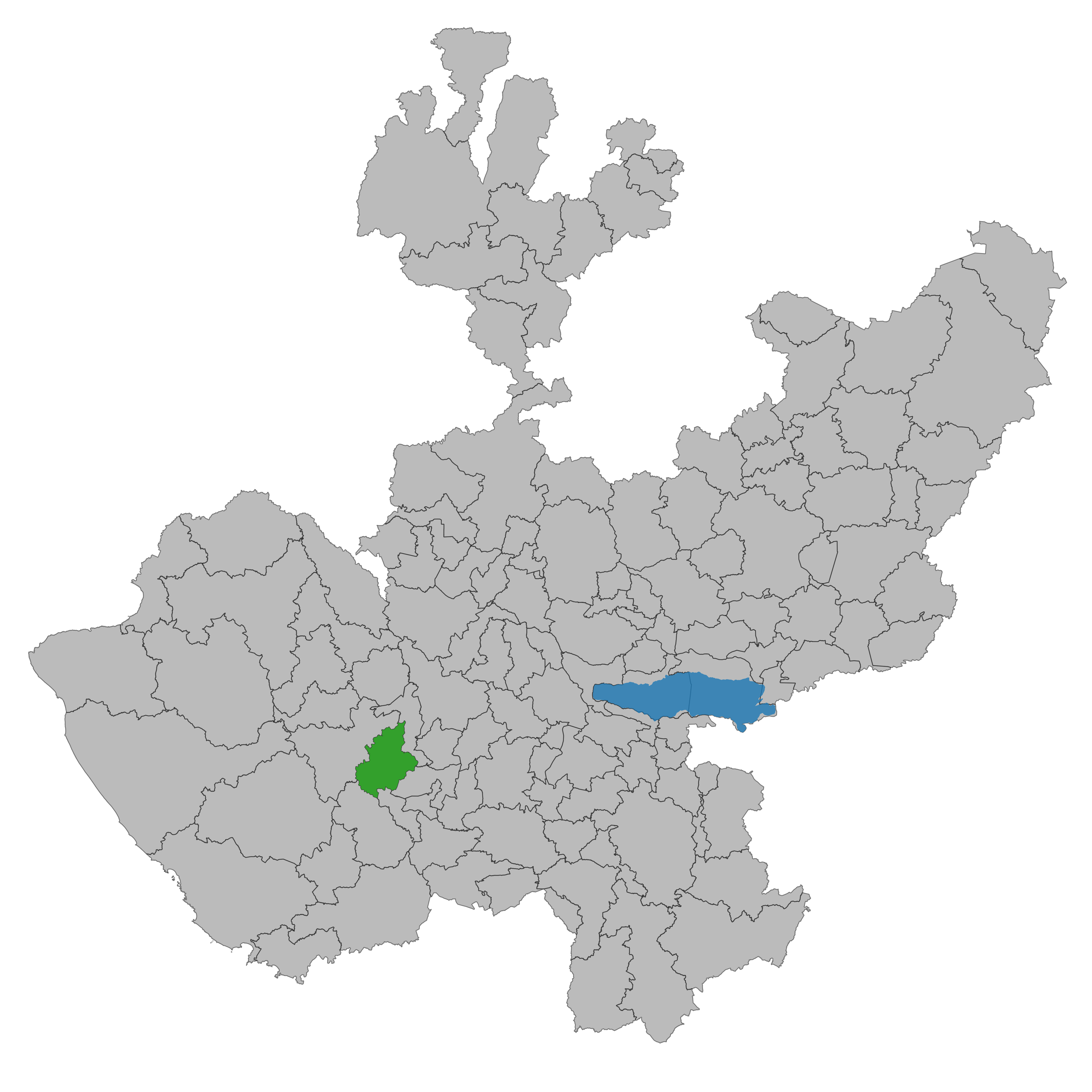
- Location of the municipality in Jalisco

- Location in Mexico
- Coordinates: 19.957°N 104.268°W
- Country: Mexico
- State: Jalisco

Area
  - Total: 443 km^{2} (171 sq mi)
  - Town: 3.43 km^{2} (1.32 sq mi)

Population (2020 census)
  - Total: 13,799
  - Density: 31.1/km^{2} (80.7/sq mi)
  - Town: 9,529
  - Town density: 2,780/km^{2} (7,200/sq mi)
- Time zone: UTC-6 (Central Standard Time)
- Website: Official Site

Unión de Tula is a town and municipality, in the Sierra de Amula region of the state of Jalisco in central-western Mexico. The municipality covers an area of 443 km^{2} (171 sq mi).

As of 2005, the municipality had a total population of 13,133.

== Population ==
The municipality has a population of 13,799 (2020 census), which includes 6,684 males and 7,115 females. About 4,664 people of this population are minors, 9,135 are adults, and 2,490 of these adults are over 60 years old.

== History ==
Tula is referred to either Tula or Tvla because of the last names of the founders. Topete, Villaseñor, Lazcano and Arreola. Tula was conquered by Francisco Cortes of San Buenaventura in 1524. Later in 1872 a new construction began and there was a second parish church. Before this region was conquered by the Spanish it was populated by indigenous tribes. These tribes depended on Amollan Manor or Amula. Amollan Manor or Amula were like leaders to these people could rely on.

== Housing ==
About 3,416 homes are registered in Union de Tula, 3,391 are congeneric to normal homes or apartments. Of these, 177 do not have a floor, and 39 have only one room. The economy situation in Tula is bad only 450 homes have their own computer, 2,544 own a washing machine and 3,237 homes have at least one or more televisions. Out of all 3,416 homes 3,212 homes have sanitary installations, 3,283 are connected to the public water supply, and 3,331 have access to electricity.

== Government ==
=== Municipal presidents ===
Term	Municipal president	Political party	Notes
1930	Luis Villaseñor	PNR	
1930	Agustín Delgadillo	PNR	
1930	José Fernández T.	PNR	
1931-1932	Filemón Fernández T.	PNR	
1932	Salvador Topete	PNR	
1932	Salvador Topete	PNR	
1933	José Fernández T.	PNR	
1934-1935	Filemón Fernández T.	PNR	
1936	José Fernández T.	PNR	
1937-1938	J. Jesús Rangel	PNR	
1938	Francisco Espino	PRM	
1939	Ignacio Ramos	PRM	
1939	Sotero de Dios	PRM	
1940	José Sandoval Valera	PRM	
1940	Manuel Pérez	PRM	
1940	José Sandoval	PRM	
1941	Salvador Sandoval V.	PRM	
1942	Nicolás Monzón	PRM	
1942	Salvador Sandoval V.	PRM	
1942	Rafael Gómez Nuñez	PRM	
1943	??	PRM	
1944	Jorge Luna V.	PRM	
1945	Simón González S.	PRM	
1945-1946	Ignacio Ramos Murillo	PRM; PRI	
1947	José Velasco Nieve	PRI	
1948	Ernesto Alcalá T.	PRI	
1948	Agustín Dueñas Ponce	PRI	
1949	J. Jesús Moreno Padilla	PRI	
1949-1952	Pedro Chagollán	PRI	
1953-1955	Salvador Villaseñor V.	PRI	
1956-1958	Simón Gómez Preciado	PRI	
1959	J. Guadalupe López B.	PRI	
1960-1961	Miguel Urista Pinzón	PRI	
1961	J. Guadalupe López B.	PRI	
1962-1964	Lorenzo Ramírez López	PRI	
1965-1967	Tarcisio Amaral R.	PRI	
1967	Luis Estrella R.	PRI	Acting municipal president
1968-1970	Carlos Aréchiga Arias	PRI	
1971-1973	Carlos Castellanos R.	PRI	
1974-1976	Juan Almaraz Ponce	PRI	
1977-1979	J. Jesús Corona Sánchez	PRI	
1980-1982	Jaime Díaz Cárdenas	PRI	
1983-1985	Edualdo Ramírez Herrera	PRI	
1986-1987	José Antonio Andrade Moreno	PRI	
1987-1988	J. Jesús Zúñiga Mendoza	PRI	
1989-1992	Pedro Campos Ramírez	PRI	
1992-1995	Hugo Salvador Castellanos Pérez	PRI	
1995-1997	Miguel Bonal González	PAN	
1998-2000	Rafael Ramírez Estrella	PAN	
2000-2003	Salvador Núñez Sandoval	PAN	
2004-2006	Joel Llamas Uribe	PAN	
01/01/2007-31/12/2009	César Eduardo Hereford Larios	PRI	
01/01/2010-30/09/2012	Jaime Ismael Díaz Brambila	PAN	
01/10/2012-30/09/2015	Ignacio Ramos Lozano	PRI; PVEM	Coalition "Compromise for Jalisco"
01/10/2015-30/09/2018	Ernesto Zermeño Valera	PRI	
01/10/2018-03/03/2021	Gala del Carmen Lepe Galván	PAN; PRD; MC	She applied for a temporary leave, to run for reelection
04/03/2021-30/04/2021	Amador Jiménez Pelayo	PAN; PRD; MC	Provisional acting municipal president
30/04/2021-2021	Sofía Rodríguez Valle	PAN; PRD; MC	Acting municipal president
01/10/2021-30/09/2024	Gala del Carmen Lepe Galván	MC	She was reelected on 06/06/2021

== Sightseeing ==
Some places you can visit are Camino a Santa Ana, which is a road many people run on for exercise, because cars rarely pass by there. There is also "El Tepehuaje" which is somewhat like a park. El Tepehuaje has many trees as well as a soccer field for kids to enjoy and it also has what some consider to be a great view.
