= Cuautla, Jalisco =

Cuautla
- Municipality and town
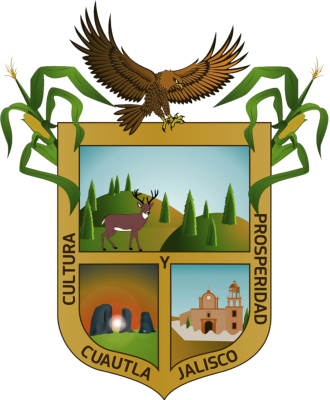
- Coat of arms

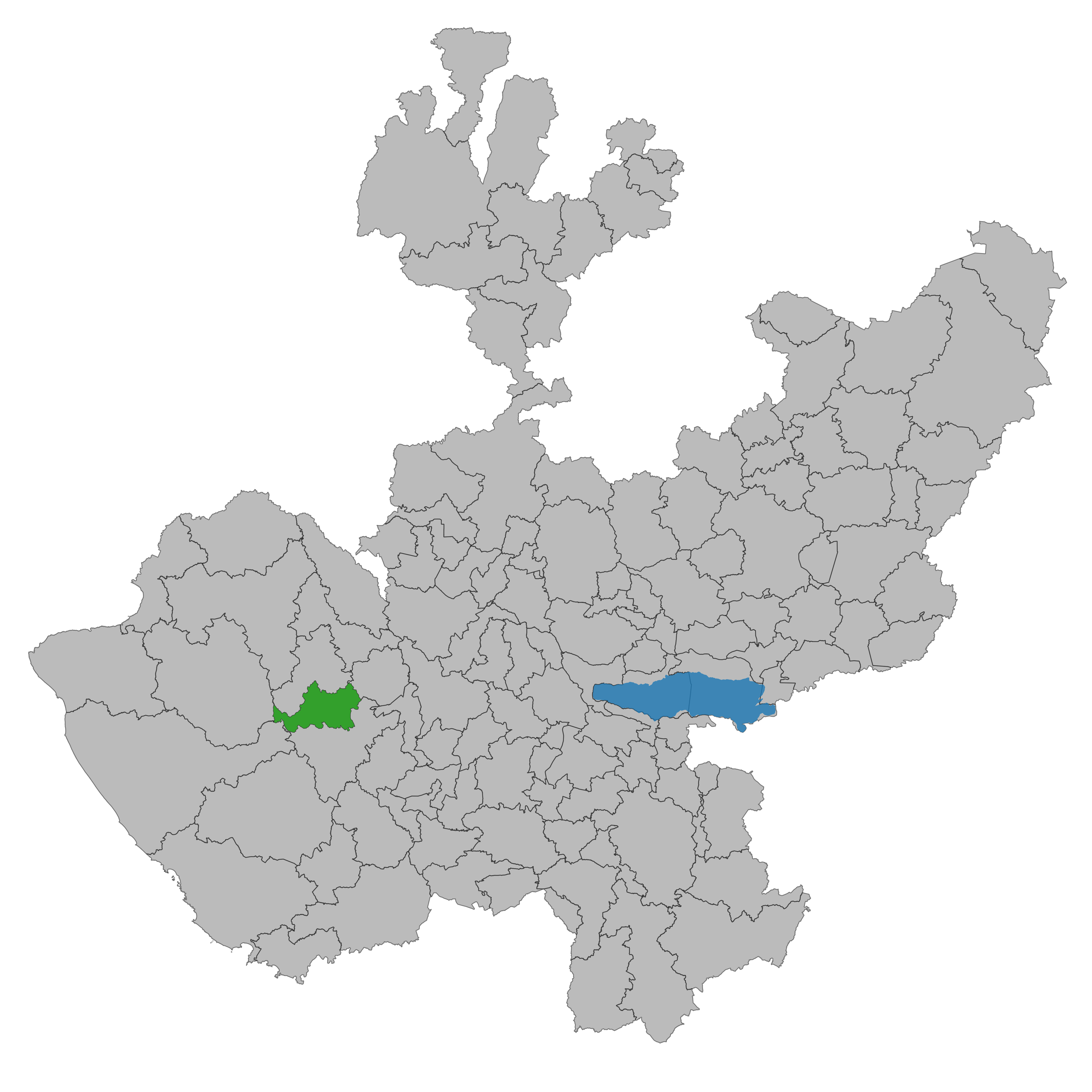
- Location of the municipality in Jalisco

- Location in Mexico
- Coordinates: 20°12′09″N 104°24′22″W
- Country: Mexico
- State: Jalisco

Area
  - Total: 417.1 km^{2} (161.0 sq mi)
  - Town: 1.87 km^{2} (0.72 sq mi)

Population (2020 census)
  - Total: 2,166
  - Density: 5.193/km^{2} (13.45/sq mi)
  - Town: 1,330
  - Town density: 711/km^{2} (1,840/sq mi)

Cuautla, Jalisco, is a small town and municipality located in the hills of western Mexico. It is situated at an elevation of 5,639 ft. (1,719 m) between Guadalajara and Puerto Vallarta. The municipality has fewer than 3,000 permanent residents.

Its name means place where eagles land, and was originally inhabited by people of the Cuyuteca culture.

Today it is primarily a town of senior citizens and children. Most people of productive age have elected to move to the United States of America seeking different opportunities. An estimated 400 Mexican restaurants in Washington, Iowa, Oregon, Colorado, California, North Carolina, Florida and Nebraska have been started by entrepreneurs from Cuautla. They operate under such trade names as Mazatlan, Casa De Oro, Hacienda Vieja, Ajuua, Azteca, Margaritas, Tequila's, Rancho Chico, 3 Margaritas, Ixtapa, Casa Bonita, Celia's, El Caporal, El Porton, Mayas, La Bamba, Los Cabos, Casa Tequila, La Fuente, Torero's, Plaza Jalisco, Casa Tapatia, Plaza Mexico, El Sombrero, Pueblo, Jalisco, Don Jose, Nuevo Vallarta, Paraiso Vallarta, and many others.

The central part of Cuautla is known as "The Plaza." it is mainly consists of the only supermarket of Cuautla, many stores, and a few restaurants.

Being gifted with ample economical success, people who left Cuautla return annually for the religious festivities, which take place between July 16–25. This "fiesta" is held in honor of Santiago Apóstol.

Many Cuautla residents have emigrated to the United States, and their children and other relatives return to the town to take part in local celebrations, where mariachi and banda music is performed. The town has a plaza de toros, used for bullfights and horse shows, and an airstrip. Las Áquilas, an archaeological site, is located nearby, and local folklore associates it with UFO sightings.

In August 2001, the City of Renton, Washington established a new Sister City relationship with Cuautla. Fundamental to the special connection between Renton and Cuautla, are Cuautla's "Absent Sons", of whom many live in or near Renton.
