= Chiquilistlán =

- Municipality and town
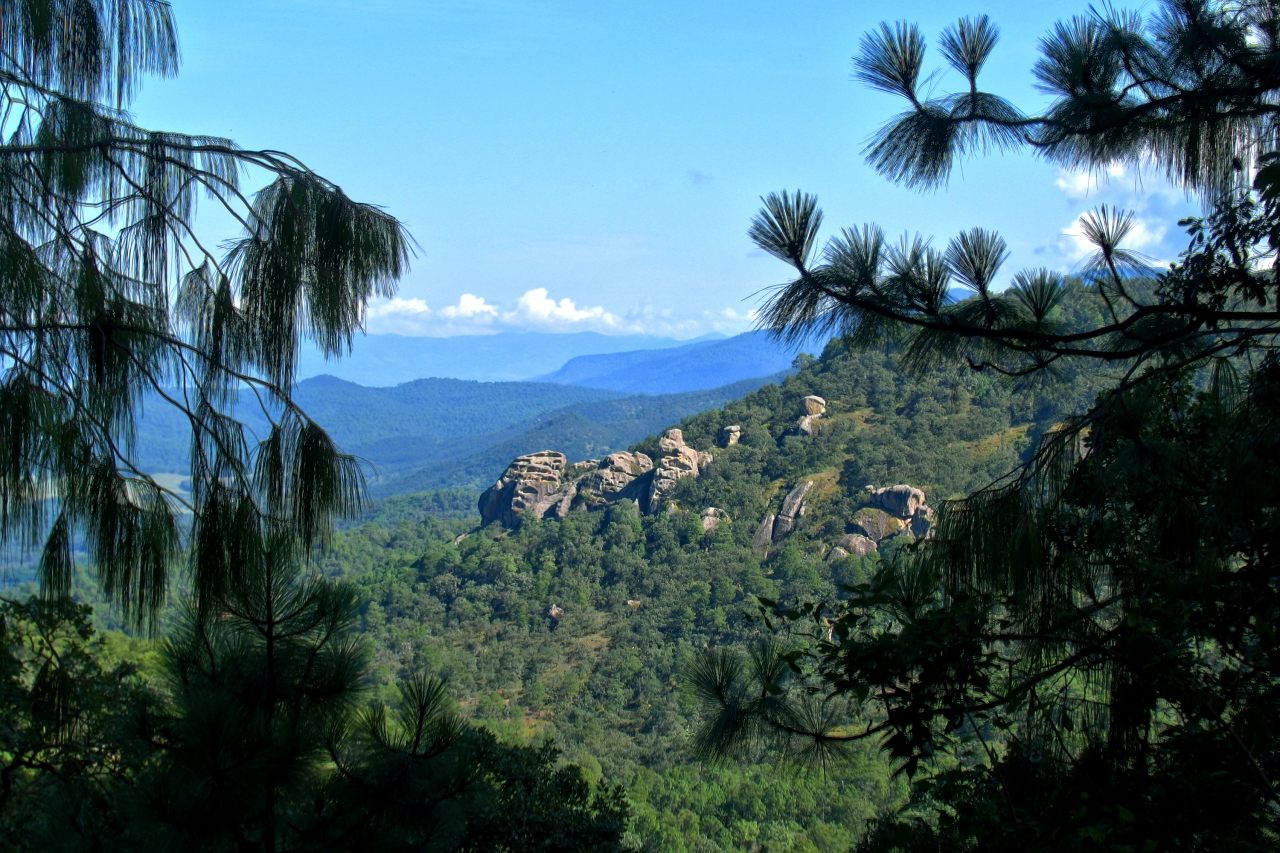

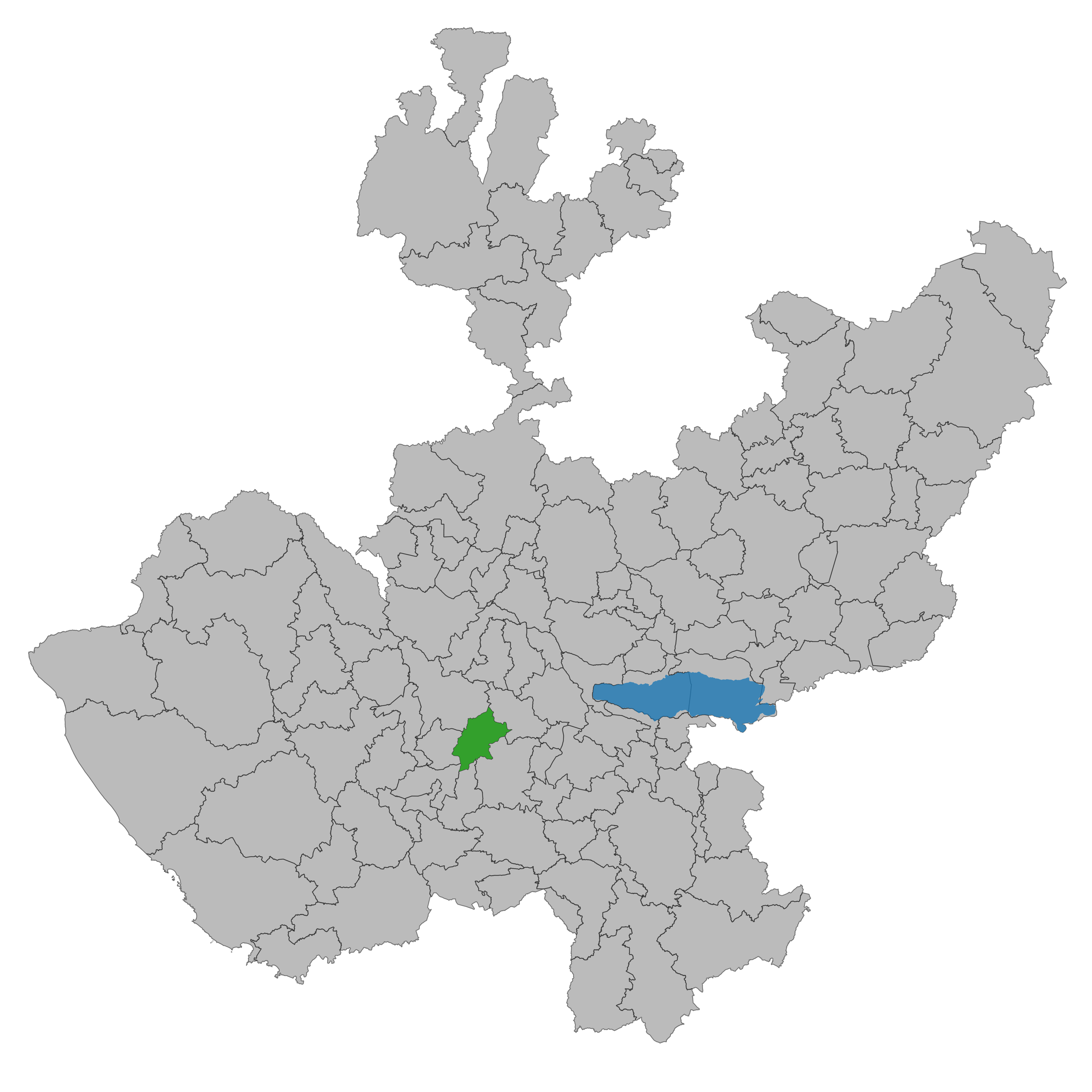
- Municipality location in Jalisco

- Location in Mexico
- Coordinates: 19°58′N 103°42′W
- Country: Mexico
- State: Jalisco

Area
  - Total: 297.4 km^{2} (114.8 sq mi)
  - Town: 2.56 km^{2} (0.99 sq mi)

Population (2020 census)
  - Total: 5,983
  - Density: 20.12/km^{2} (52.10/sq mi)
  - Town: 4,299
  - Town density: 1,680/km^{2} (4,350/sq mi)
- Time zone: UTC-6 (Central (US Central))

Chiquilistlán is a small town in the Mexican state of Jalisco. It is located in the Sierra Tapalpa mountains, at the foot of a hill called Chiquilichi, some 75 kilometres to the south-west of state capital Guadalajara.

Chiquilistlán is a municipal seat, serving as the administrative centre for the surrounding municipality (municipio) of the same name.

== Towns in the municipality ==
The municipality has 27 towns; the most important ones are: Chiquilistlán (municipal seat), Jalpa (delegation), San José de la Peña, Comala, Cofradía de Jalpa, Los Llanitos, El Agostadero, El Limoncito, Capula, Citala, Almazalte, Limoncito, San Cristóbal, Guamúchil, Milpillas, Moralete, Agua Delgada, El Realito, El Mortero, Churinzio, and La Mora.

== Government ==
The form of government is democratic and depends on Jalisco state government, and federal government. Elections are held every three years, when the municipal president and her/his council are elected.

=== Municipal presidents ===
Municipal president	Term	Political party	Notes
José Manuel Lepe Santana	01-01-1983–31-12-1985	PRI	
Francisco Guadalupe Enríquez Michel	01-01-1986–31-12-1988	PRI	
J. Rafael Cisneros de la Torre	1989–1992	PRI	
J. Manuel Asunción Lepe Santana	1992–1995	PRI	
Antonio Corona Monroy	1995–1997	PRI	
José Luis Santana Mendoza	01-01-1998–31-12-2000	PRI	
Jaime Aguilar Castañeda	01-01-2001–31-12-2003	PRI	
Pablo Baltazar Pérez	01-01-2004–31-12-2006	PAN	
Josafat Santana Castillo	01-01-2007–31-12-2009	PAN	
Juan Carlos Gudiño Ruelas	01-01-2010–30-09-2012	PRI; Panal	Coalition "Alliance for Jalisco"
Jesús Salvador Cuenca Cisneros	01-10-2012–30-09-2015	PRI; PVEM	Coalition "Compromise for Jalisco"
Carlos Alberto Corona Bayardo	01-10-2015–30-09-2018	PRD	
María Pérez Enríquez	01-10-2018–30-09-2021	PRI	
Álvaro González Alvarado	01-10-2021–30-09-2024	Hagamos; MC	On 15-03-2022 he moved to the Citizens' Movement party
Álvaro González Alvarado	01-10-2024–	MC	He was reelected
