= Tenamaxtlán =

- Municipality and town
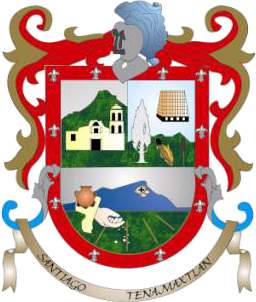
- Coat of arms

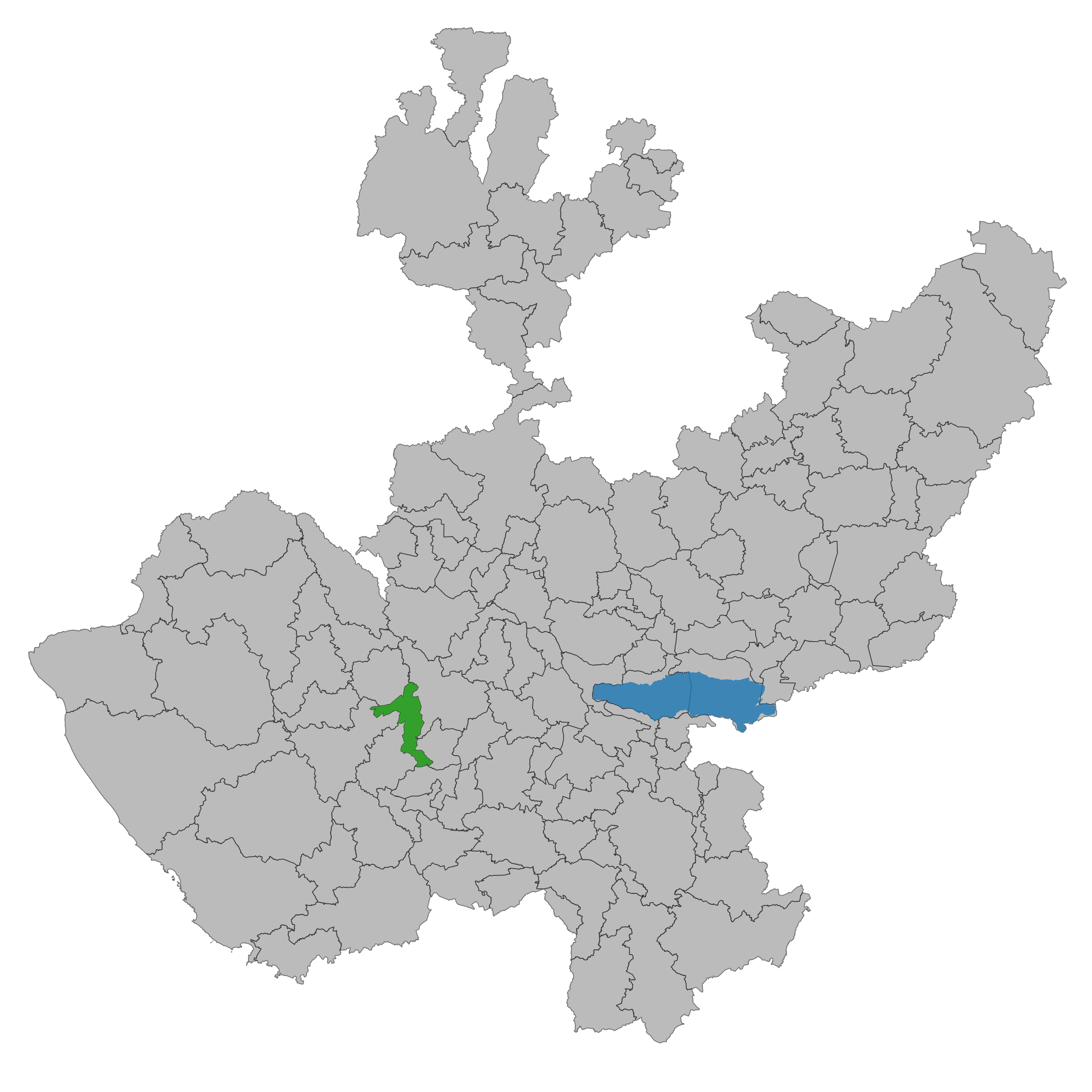
- Location of the municipality in Jalisco

- Location in Mexico
- Country: Mexico
- State: Jalisco
- Founded: March 25, 1538

Area
  - Total: 281.5 km^{2} (108.7 sq mi)
  - Town: 3.02 km^{2} (1.17 sq mi)

Population (2020 census)
  - Total: 7,302
  - Density: 25.94/km^{2} (67.18/sq mi)
  - Town: 4,940
  - Town density: 1,640/km^{2} (4,240/sq mi)
- Time zone: UTC-6 (Central Standard Time)

Tenamaxtlán is a municipio (municipality) and town in the Sierra de Amula Region in the state of Jalisco, Mexico.

Tenamaxtlán was founded in 1538. The current mayor of the town is Mtro. José Manuel Cárdenas Castillo.

== Toponymy ==
Its name has been interpreted by some people or authors as "Place where the Stoves Abound", although others claim that it means "Place of Tenamaxtles" or "Stone of Stoves". Tenamaxtle comes from the Spanish word tenamaste meaning any of the three stones traditionally used to elevate a comal above a fire in Mesoamerican cultures.

== History ==
It belonged to the Autlán lordship. The chiefdom of Tenamaxtlán included the towns of Atengo, Ayutla, Soyatlán, Cuyutlán, and Tepantla.

In 1524-1525, Francisco Cortés de San Buenaventura conquered this region, giving orders to Martín Monje and Pedro Gómez in Tenamaxtlán. It is not known about Pedro Gómez how long he kept his encomienda, but there is evidence that Martín Monje settled in Tenamaxtlán, and although he was recognized as a resident of Colima (where he had a house), he not only kept his lot but enlarged it, eventually owning a vast area that he bequeathed to his descendants.

The town was originally on the Mesa de las Tablas, northwest of its current site, where the lagoon drained. Later the indigenous people moved to the hill of Ayutepec where they suffered a natural disaster caused by a flood that surrounded the hill, being forced to settle on the hill of Bonete, where the Spanish found them.

It was founded by natives of the old town of Hilotepeque, who met to found the current town in the chapel of Santiago. Its founders were the following people: Francisco de la Cruz, Gaspar Hilario, José Lorenzo, Cristóbal Leonor, Bruno Feliciano, Miguel Lorenzo, Gaspar Florencio, Ambrosio Cayetano, Luis Luciano and Gerónimo Mauricio with their families. They gathered in the town of Santiago de Tenamaxtlán in 1535. The natives resisted going down at first for fear of floods, but in the end, they gave in.

The conquest of the town is due to Francisco Cortés de San Buenaventura, who was also present at the founding of the town along with Juan de Escárcena, the latter as royal judge of settlement of the towns. Francisco toured Autlan, passing through Tenamaxtlán and Tecolotlan, heading to present-day Nayarit, where he was the protagonist of the passage through the Banderas valleys.

According to a document called "Title of the Legal Foundation of Tenamaxtlán" (which is registered in the Public Property Registry of the City of Autlán), the settlement of this population took place on March 25, 1538.

In the year 1613, the then governor of Tenamaxtlán, Don Bartolomé de Jiménez, an indigenous man, was succeeded by his son Diego de Jiménez; both chiefs from Tenamaxtlán. That same year Fray Luis Maldonado, guardian of Tecolotlán, laid the first stone of the ancient temple of Tenamaxtlán that they dedicated to the Apostle Santiago. The governor of the town, Don Diego Jiménez, was in charge of the work, along with the mayor Gabriel Alonso, the councilor Diego Felipe, and the butler Juan de los Santos.

On August 31, 1823, the adherence to federalism of the town of Tenamaxtlán was proclaimed, in the following terms: “In the town of Tenamaxtlán, of the Autlán de la Grana district, the mayor Dionisio Santana and the councilors: Ignacio de la Cueva, Alejandro Ramírez, José Miguel Martínez, Ignacio Vargas and Attorney Salvador Ballesteros, and in the company of the commissioners of the towns of Atengo and Soyatlán, with the largest number of residents who voted in general and unanimously for adhesion to the government of the Republic Federated”, and it is signed by the commission chosen to sign by the neighborhood: Urvano Ayraldo, José Antonio García de la Paz, Juan Nepomuceno Díaz de Salas, Antonio Sixto Santana, Secretary.

In 1825, Tenamaxtlán already had a town hall with Atengo and Soyatlán as subject towns. It included the following haciendas and ranches: San Clemente, Colotitlán, Juanacatlán, and San Pedro.

From 1825 to 1910 it belonged to the 6th canton of Autlán. From the Congressional decree of September 21, 1832, it is clear that Tenamaxtlán already existed as a municipality when it was mentioned as such.

== Holidays ==
Civil Holidays

- March 25 - Anniversary of the founding of the municipality. A weeklong cultural celebration takes place.
- September 15–16 - Mexican Independence Day festivities.
- December 24 to January 5 - Fiestas Taurinas (Bullfighting Festivities).

Religious Holidays

- Festival in honor of the Most Pure Virgin of Perpetual Help (June 25–27)
- The Virgin of the Nativity of Atengo arrives in the town 2 days after Corpus Christi where the image is received with great fervor and devotion. And it is taken back to its basilica until August 30. This tradition has been carried out for more than 400 years. This is considered one of the oldest pilgrimages in Latin America.
- Festivities in honor of the Virgin of the Immaculate Conception and the Virgin of Guadalupe (November 30 to December 12)

Education

During the years 2017-2018, Tenamaxtlán has had a wide variety of preschools, primary schools, middle schools, and high schools; all of these consist of 31 educational institutions. These include 12 preschools, 10 primary schools, 5 middle schools, 2 high schools, 1 special-education center, and 1 vocational training school.IIEG- Tenamaxtlan Municipal Report
