= Ayutla, Jalisco =

Ayutla
- Municipality and town
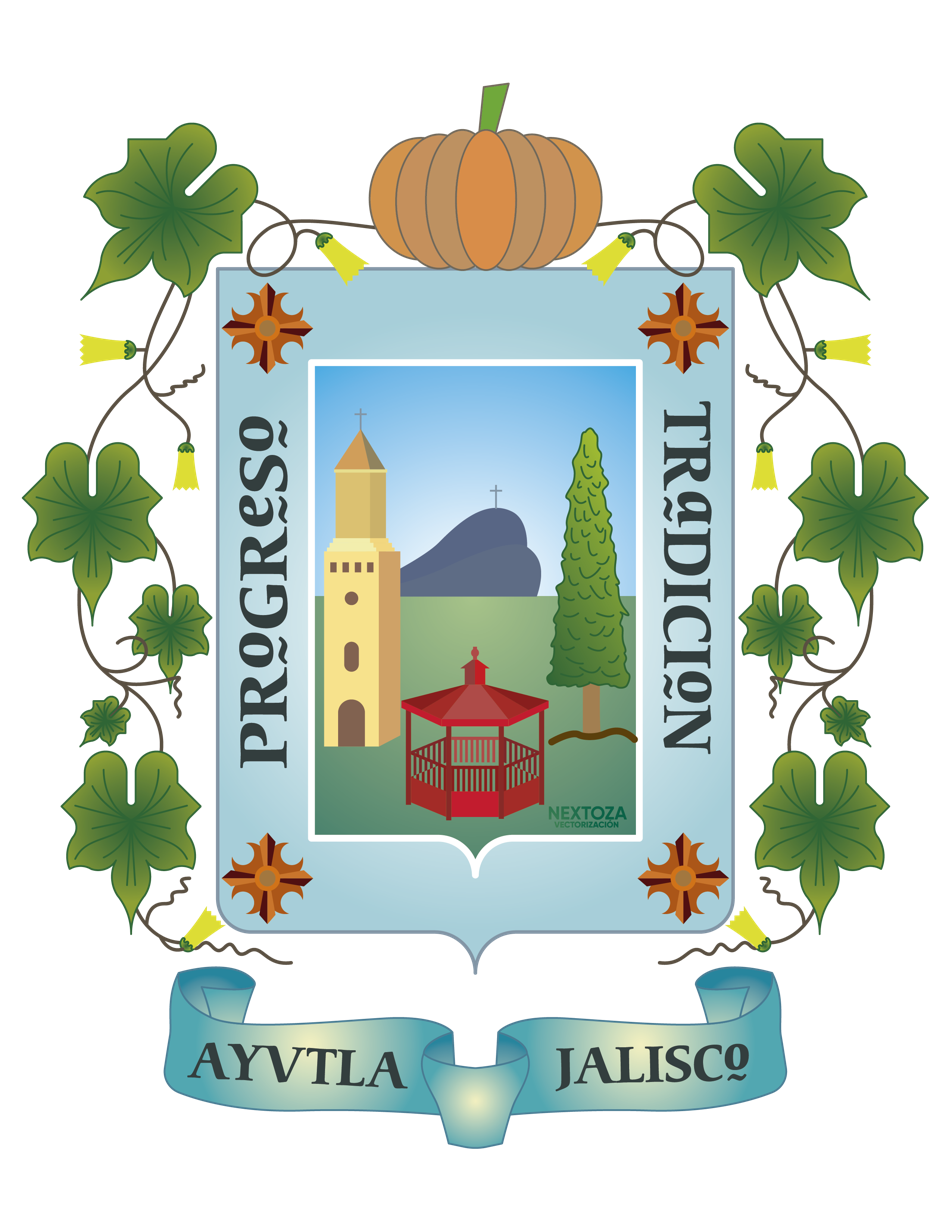
- Coat of arms

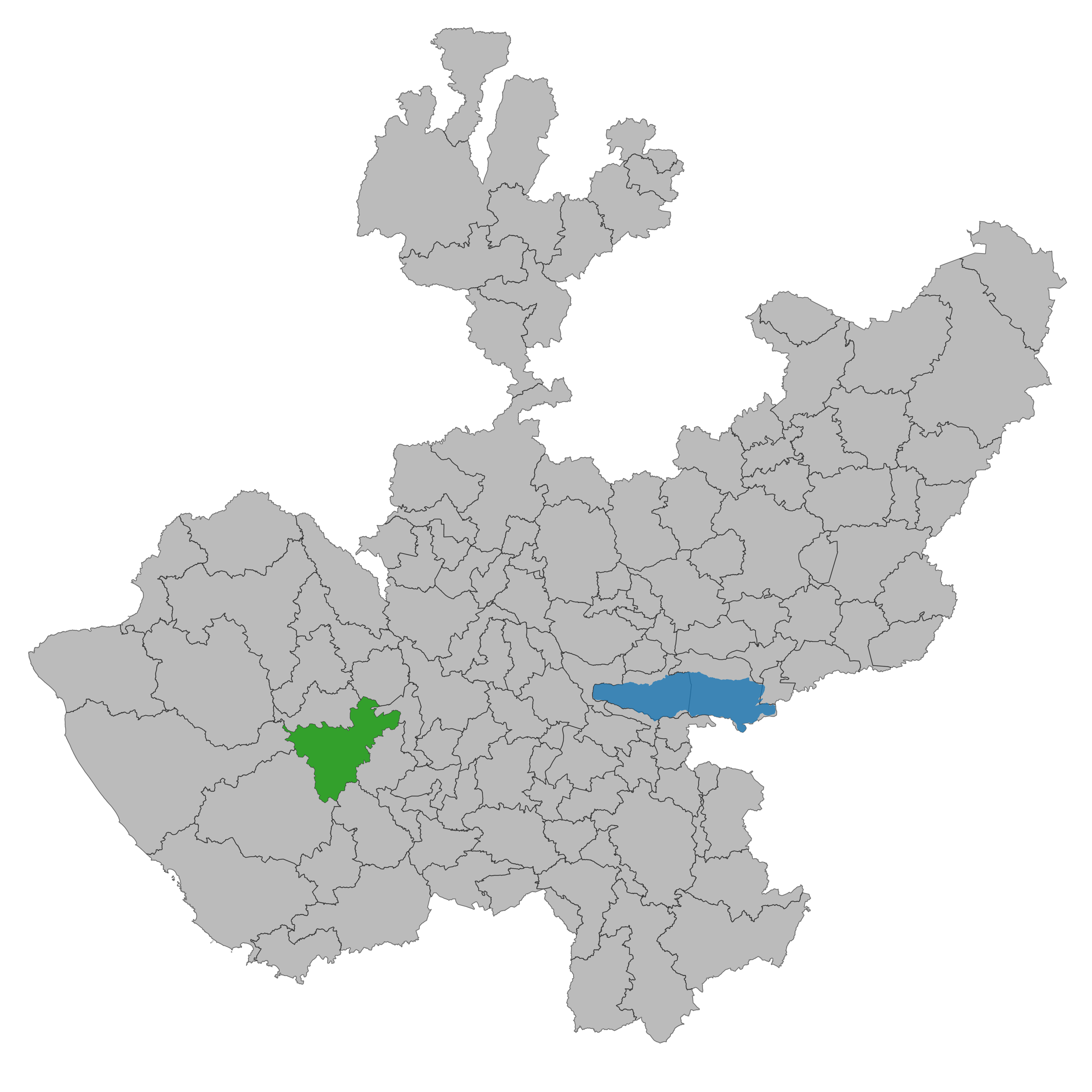
- Location of the municipality in Jalisco

- Location in Mexico
- Coordinates: 20°49′N 104°12′W
- Country: Mexico
- State: Jalisco

Area
  - Total: 883.4 km^{2} (341.1 sq mi)
  - Town: 2.84 km^{2} (1.10 sq mi)

Population (2020 census)
  - Total: 12,880
  - Density: 14.58/km^{2} (37.76/sq mi)
  - Town: 7,469
  - Town density: 2,630/km^{2} (6,810/sq mi)

Ayutla is a town and municipality, in Jalisco in central-western Mexico. The municipality covers an area of 883.4 km^{2}.

As of 2005, the municipality had a total population of 12,221.

Populated places within Ayutla include San Miguel de la Sierra.
