= Tonaya =

- Municipality and town
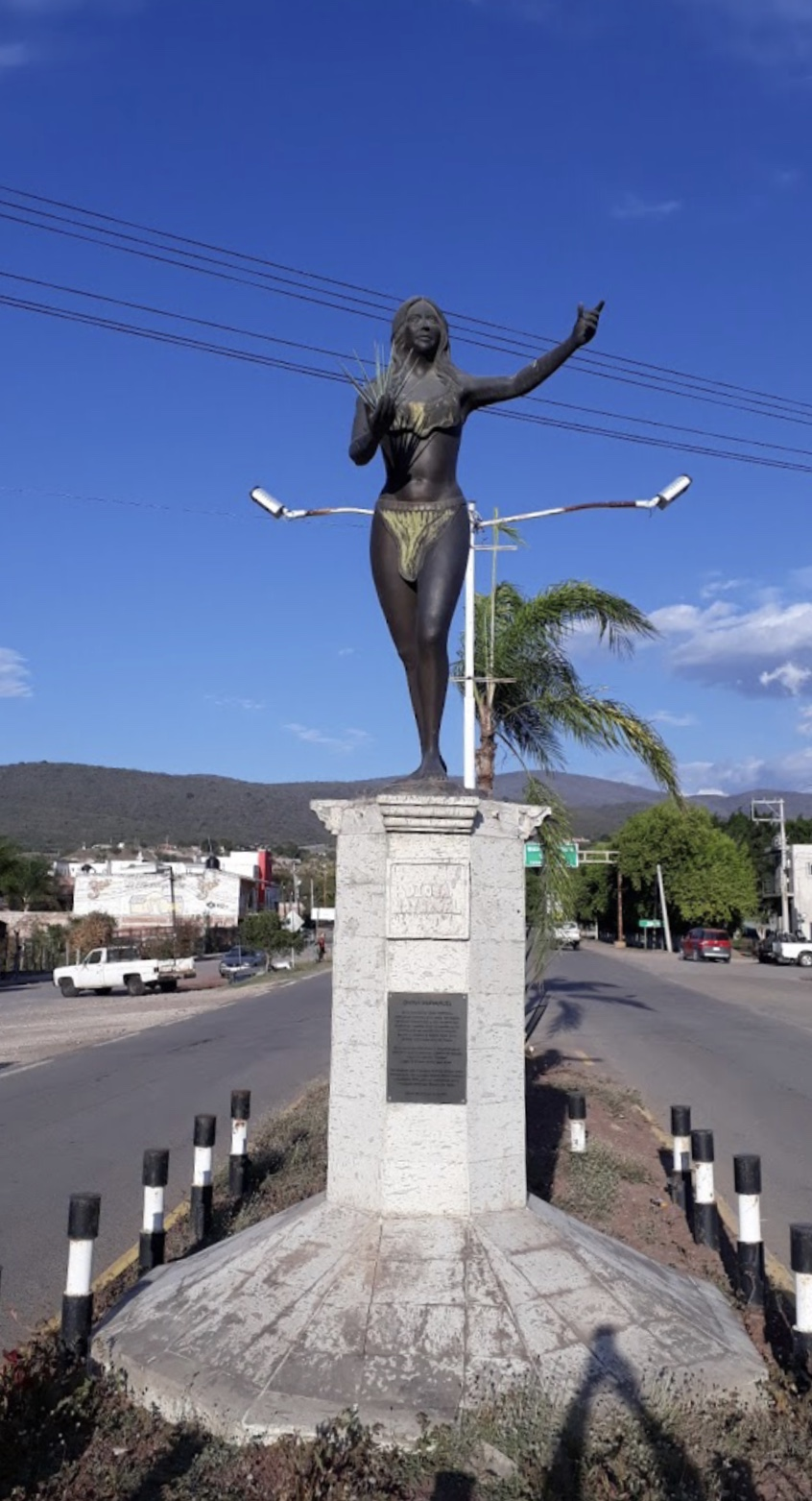
- La Diosa del Agave, Tonaya, Jalisco, México

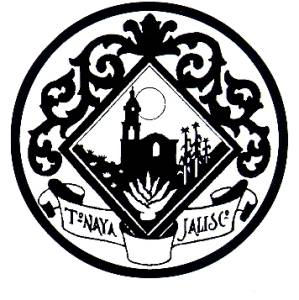
- Flag Coat of arms

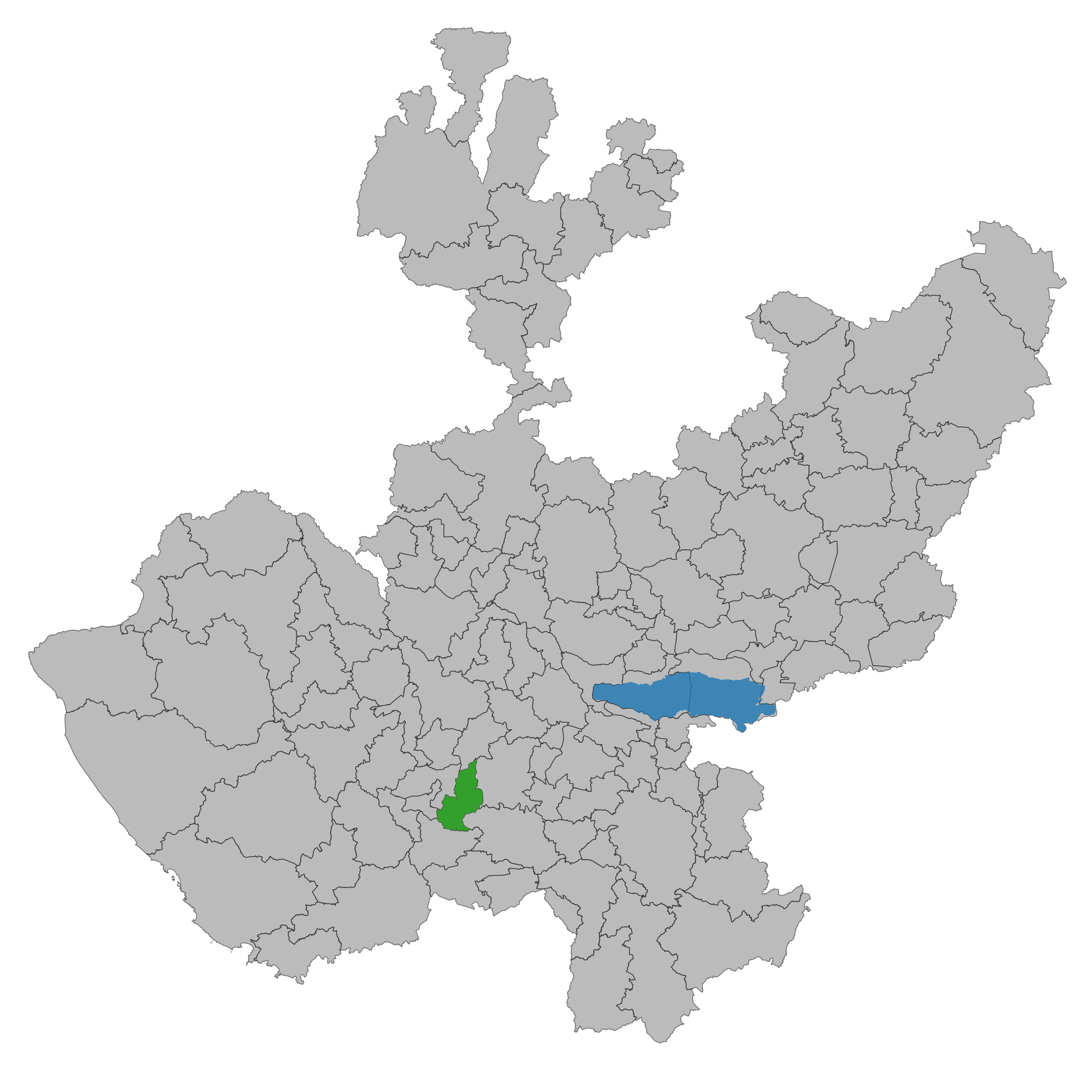
- Location of the municipality in Jalisco

- Location in Mexico
- Coordinates: 19°47′N 103°58′W
- Country: Mexico
- State: Jalisco
- Founded: March 13, 1825
- Founded as: Al oriente donde sale el sol
- Municipal status: 1825

Government
  - Type: Democratic Republic
  - Municipal President: Librado Vizcaino Álvarez ((PAN)(PRD))

Area
  - Municipality: 293.6 km^{2} (113.4 sq mi)
  - Town: 1.81 km^{2} (0.70 sq mi)

Population (2020 census)
  - Municipality: 5,961
  - Density: 20.30/km^{2} (52.58/sq mi)
  - Town: 3,706
  - Town density: 2,050/km^{2} (5,300/sq mi)
- Demonym(s): Jalisciense, Tonayense
- Time zone: UTC-6 (Central Standard Time)
- Postal code: 48760
- Area code: 343
- Website: http://www.tonayajalisco.gob.mx

Tonaya is a town and municipality, in Jalisco in central-western Mexico. The municipality covers an area of 293.6 km^{2}. As of 2020, the municipality had a total population of 5,961.

== History ==
Tonaya, Jalisco is a city of Catholicism. In the 1800s the church of Nuestra Señora de la Asunción in Tonaya was built. During that time it was known as, church of the Virgin of Tonaya, the residue and bell tower of this church can still be seen standing tall and majestic, even when it's no longer in use becoming a historic part of the municipality Tonaya. The last 200 years it has stayed the tallest building in Tonaya signaling high authority in the religious area of the city. But the biggest religious story of Tonaya is the story of the Marian apparition that protects the town by the name of La Virgen de Tonaya. Her physical form has been said to have only been seen by very few people in the nearby mountains. It is also said that her spirit resides in a doll that was made to replicate her, located in the church. Every year she is taken out of her church viewing spot and carried through the streets of Tonaya to be seen by the whole population of the city.

Its foundation dates back to pre-Hispanic times by tribes of Toltec origin. Tonaya was located to the east of the present town on the llanitos of some hills that still keep the remains of the foundations of the primitive town. Its founders were Otomín, Tlatoli, Tzomitloc and Tlayomich who together with several natives went out to populate the region. Many indigenous people and their families died when they settled down. The survivors chose Tzomitloc (or Amole) as cacique.

Tonaya belonged to the cacicazgo of Tuxcacuesco, depending in turn on the province of Amole (or Amula). This province comprised the territory from the foot of the volcanoes of Colima to the beaches of Barra de Navidad; Upon the arrival of the Spaniards it was ruled by Hopey.

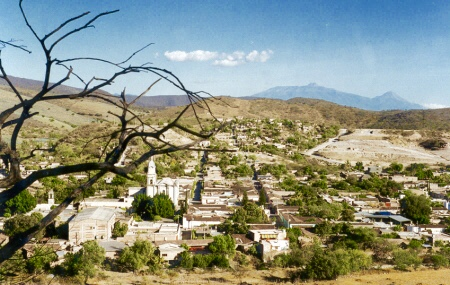
Vista de Tonaya

In 1523 this region was subdued by the Spanish armies led by Alonso de Ávalos, in whose honor these possessions took the name of the Province of Ávalos.

From 1825 Tonaya had a town hall and included the haciendas and ranches of Higueras, Coatlán, Coatlancillo, Santa Gertrudis, Tecomatlán and Amacuatitlán.

Its establishment as a municipality predates the year 1837 as follows from the decree of March 13 of that year. In 1911, by decree number 1 383 published on March 10, its limits were determined with the municipality of Tuxcacuesco.

== Geography ==
The geology and topography of Tonaya are the lands and hills of the municipality which belong to the Cretaceous period, and are composed of limestone, gypsum, intrusive igneous rocks, granite, granodiorite, diorite and syenite. Most of the municipality is made up of hills, occupied by mountains that belong to the foothills of the Tapalpa mountain range; the semi-flat area is covered by subtropical vegetation, and there is a small amount of flat area at heights of 900 to 1,000 meters above sea level.

== Economy ==
Tonaya's economy mainly consists of main sectors, products and services such as agriculture, cattle raising, industry, forest exploitation, mining, fishing, commerce and services. The municipality has 44.4 km^{2} suitable for cultivation, of which 9% has irrigation and local crops are corn, beans, sorghum and agave. Cattle are raised from meat and milk, swine, sheep, goats, meat and stall birds, and hives. "Las Tabernas" predominates where mezcal is industrialized. In addition there is a small furniture industry that is constantly growing. The oak and oak species that are found in the forests located in the northern and eastern part of the municipality are mainly exploited. Mining is represented by deposits of metallic minerals such as gold, silver and copper; and non-metallic lime, plaster and marble. Freshwater fishing takes place on the Tonaya River, capturing jackal, crappie and catfish. Commerce in the municipality consists of small and medium establishments of food, drinks and groceries, to meet the demands of the population. Professional, technical, communal, social, personal, touristic and maintenance services are offered.

Nemesio Oseguera Cervantes known as el ("El Mencho"), leader of The Jalisco New Generation Cartel (Spanish: Cártel de Jalisco Nueva Generación, CJNG and Matazetas) has reportedly been seen by the residents of the municipality in restaurants of the main plaza, traveling the streets and has requested medical services in the area.

== Culture ==
Archeological

To the east of the town archaeological remains have been located of what was the prehispanic town of Tonaya. Highlighting what could be the ruins of a "cue" or shrine.

Historical monuments

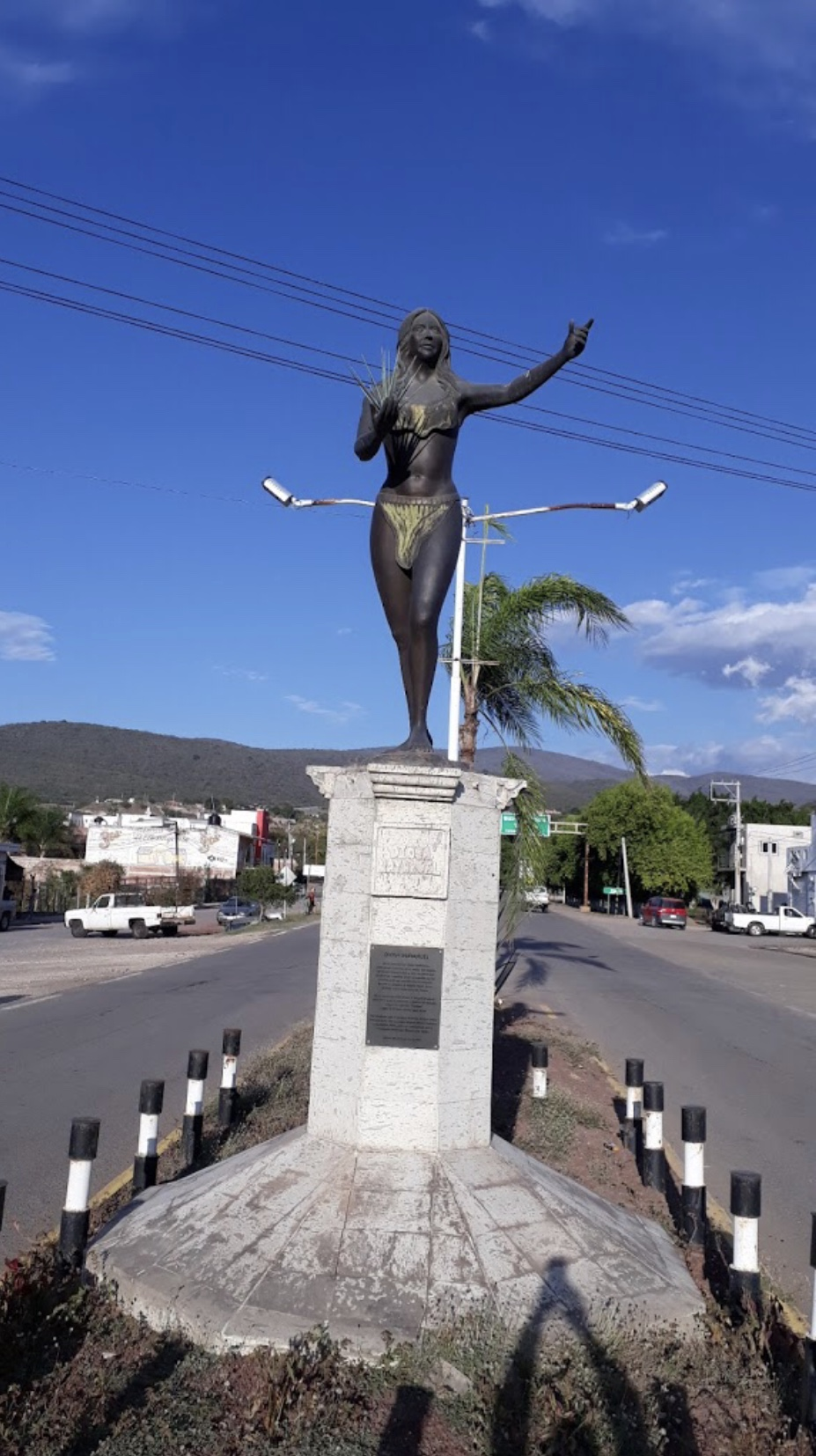
La Diosa del Agave

There are five bronze busts erected in honor of illustrious figures such as Benito Juárez, Miguel Hidalgo and Costilla, José María Morelos, Manuel M. Bravo and La Diosa del Agave located in the entrance of Tonaya.

Welcome Sign

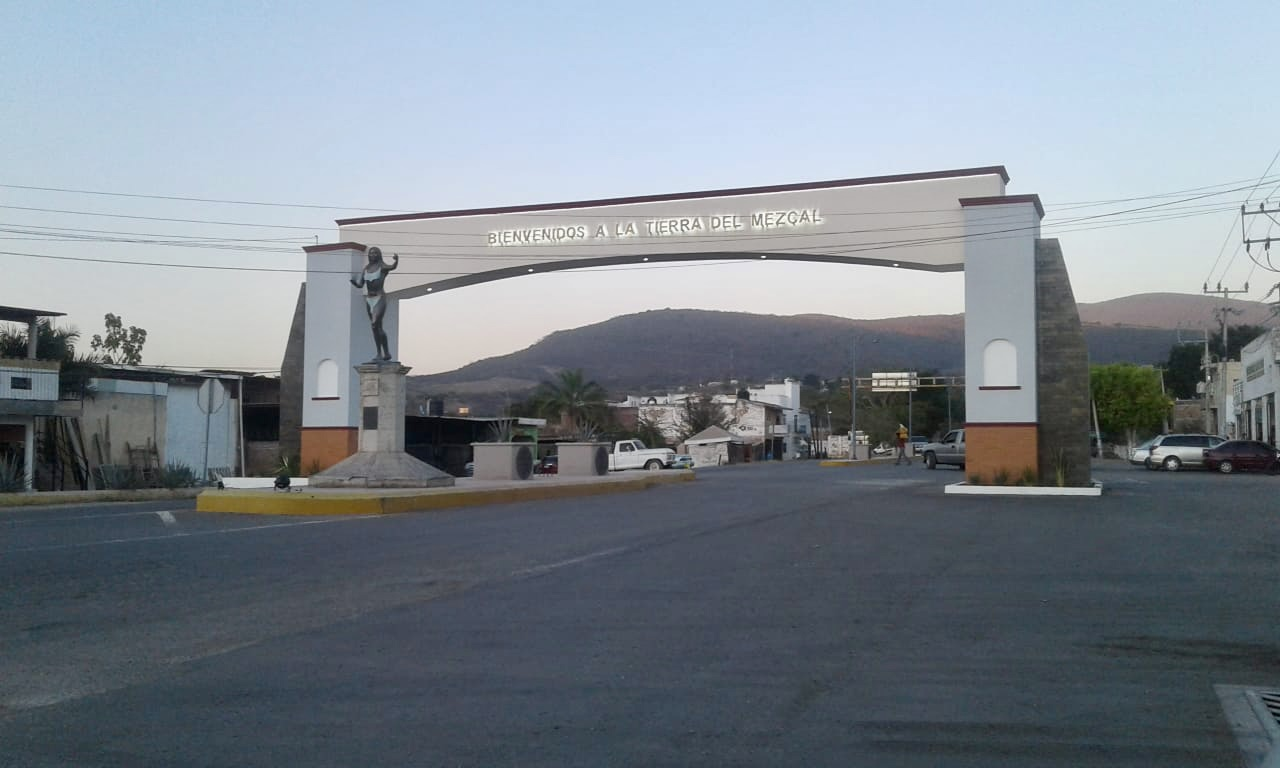
Bienvenidos a la Tierra del Mezcal

There is a welcome sign at the entrance of Tonaya that says Bienvenidos a la tierra del Mezcal which translates to Welcome to the Land of Mezcal in English. This sign welcomes visitors and La Diosa del Agave can be seen at the center in front of it.

Artwork

Literature and poetry works titled "El Quijote Huehuenche" and "Versos Picarescos" from the inspiration of José Antonio Michel stand out; as well as a series of stories by José Trinidad Lepe Preciado.

In the hall of the Town Hall of the Municipal Presidency, there is the mural dedicated to Justice, made by Professor Amador Toscano Quintero in 1996.

Handicrafts

Craft and cross-stitch work, huaraches, wood articles and saddlery (saddles); as well as raw leather soguillas as well as pouches, chiquigüites and otate hats.

Traditional costumes

The charro suit, characteristic of the municipality; is artistically crafted in the area.

Gastronomy

Food: Kid's goat, white pozole, shrimp tacos, pipían, carnitas and pork rinds, tamales, sopitos and tostadas. Sweets: Pumpkins, plums and tanned guava; as well as garapiñados and borrachitos. Drinks: Mezcal, pulque, atole and pomegranates of pomegranate, guayabilla, tamarind and myrtle.

Holidays and traditions: Popular Festivities

The 15th of January is celebrated, with special fervor, the coronation of the Virgin of Tonaya. The festivity dedicated to San José takes place on March 19. From 6 to 15 August the festivities are celebrated in honor of Our Lady of the Assumption. On January 24 in Coatlancillo, January 10 in the Cerrito, on November 12 in the Asmoles and December 12 in the Guadalupana colony.

Plaza de Torros

From December 24 to January 2 bullfights are held.

== Architecture ==
Tonaya's historical monuments emphasize the religious buildings like the church of Our Lady of the Assumption (located in the county seat), the Temple of Our Lady of Peace in Coatlancillo (Colonial style) and the Temple of Santa Gertrudis dating from the eighteenth century, with the oldest in this municipality.

The plaza located in the center of the municipality by the Church of Our Lady of the Assumption has recently been renovated with a garden.

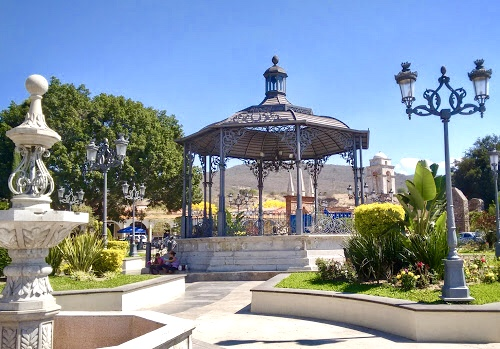
Tonaya Plaza de Armas

House of Culture "Dr. Mónico Soto" which was inaugurated in 2007 and has space to develop activities such as dance, singing, music, exhibitions, lectures, among others.

The old ruins of the old haciendas of Coatlancillo and Coatlán (which are still in good condition) of the Refugio, Los Yugos, El Paso and Tenango.

== Tourism ==
It has natural attractions such as the forests located in the northern and eastern part of the municipality and the Coatlancillo, Las Higueras, Amacuauhtitlán, El Paso de San Francisco and El Refugio haciendas.

== Education ==
The educational infrastructure of the municipality in the 2004-2005 cycle consisted of 2 Pre-school centers with 4 groups and 184 children served by 6 Educators. Two primary schools with 12 groups and 228 students served by 12 teachers. One secondary schools with 17 groups, 248 students and 12 teachers. One. high school with 220 young people and 9 teachers. One Education school with 144 attended by 10 teachers.

== Health ==
Health care is provided in the municipality by the Jalisco Secretary of Health, the Mexican Social Security Institute (IMSS) and some private doctors. In the municipality there are two health centers operating, one in the headquarter that is attended by a doctor, three medical interns and four nurses and the other center in Coatlancillo, there are also ten rural health homes in the localities. The social welfare line is attended in its different aspects by the System for the Integral Development of the Family (DIF) through the Municipal Committee.

== Supply ==
With regard to services for the popular consumption, this need is basically covered by grocery stores and retail stores that are distributed in the municipality.

== Sports ==
With regard to sport, the municipality counts on its practice with sports centers such as la Unidad Deportiva de Tonaya, the municipality has whole adequate facilities for the practice of various sports: baseball, soccer, volleyball, basketball, athletics and children's games. For the promotion of culture and recreation there is: civic plaza, gardens, cinema, library, bullring and recreational centers.

== Housing ==
Tonaya has a total of 1,454 homes with an average of 3.82 occupants per dwelling, of these dwellings, 11.34% have a dirt floor, 34.47% are built with temporary material, the rest are built with roof tiles, and adobe, partition or block on the walls.

== Public services ==
The municipality offers its inhabitants the services of public lighting, markets, trails, parking, cemeteries, roads, public toilet, public safety, transit, parks, gardens and sports centers. Regarding basic services, 97.8% of the inhabitants have drinking water; in sewerage coverage is 90.8% and in the electric power service 98.3%.

== Media ==
With regard to the media, the municipality has mail, telegraph, telephone, fax, radio and television signal and radiotelephony.

== Transportation ==
Land transportation is made through highway number 54 and highway number 80 Guadalajara-Tecolotlán-Unión de Tula, making a junction towards El Grullo-Tonaya. Foreign land transportation is done by direct buses and bypasses. Urban and rural transportation is carried out in rental vehicles and private vehicles.

== Localities ==
In total, Tonaya has 58 localities, 29 localities occupied by inhabitants, the most important being Tonaya (municipal seat), Coatlancillo, El Cerrito, Las Amoles and La Liebre and 29 unoccupied localities.

The 29 inhabited localities are: Alpizahua, Amacuautitlán, Atarjeas de Covarrubias (San Isidro), Coatlancillo, Coatlán, Coyotomate, El Cerrito, El Convento, El Paso de San Francisco, La Casita, La Cofradía, La Piña, Las Higueras, Las Liebres (La Liebre), Las Playas, Los Asmoles, Rancho Los González, Metapan, Ojo de Agua, Rancho de Reinaldo Michel, Rancho Escondido, Rancho Nuevo, Rancho RRR, San Luis Tenango (Tenango), San Rafael, Santa Gertrudis, Tecomatlán and Tonaya.

The 29 localities that are unoccupied are El Carricito, Cuatro Vientos, Las Guásimas, Nacaxtle, El Tepame, Runditlán, Bonetillo, La Barranca, El Carbunco, Coastecomate, Los Guajes, La Labor, El Llano, La Playita del Tempisque, Potrero de Cano, El Astillero, Rancho Alegre, El Tempisque (El Espinal), Las Trancas, El Volantín, El Alto, El Casco, Las Catarinas, Julián Guzmán, Moisés Guevera, Plan de los Amolitos, La Pulga, La Rusia, and Las Vegas.

== Gallery ==
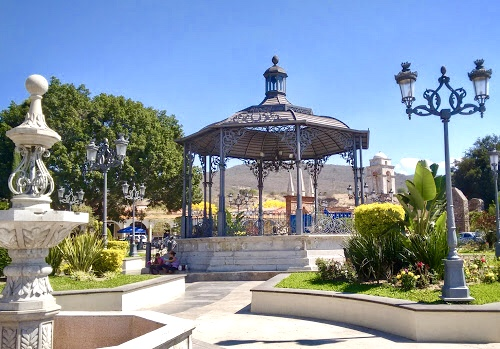
Plaza Principal

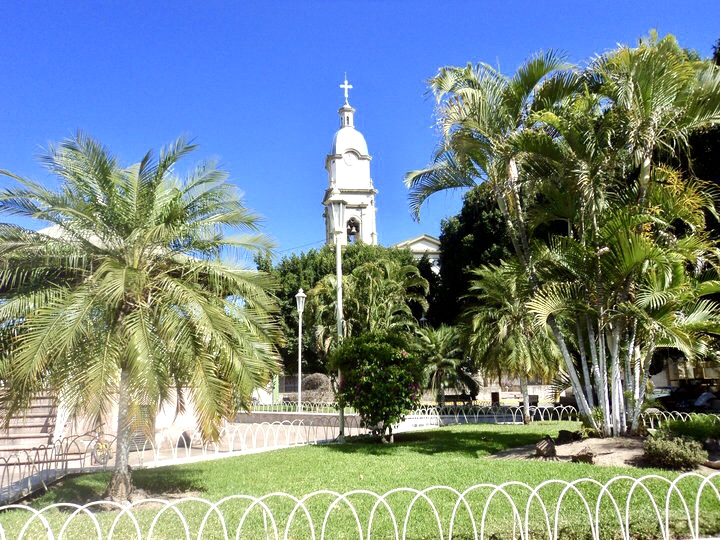
Vista del Templo

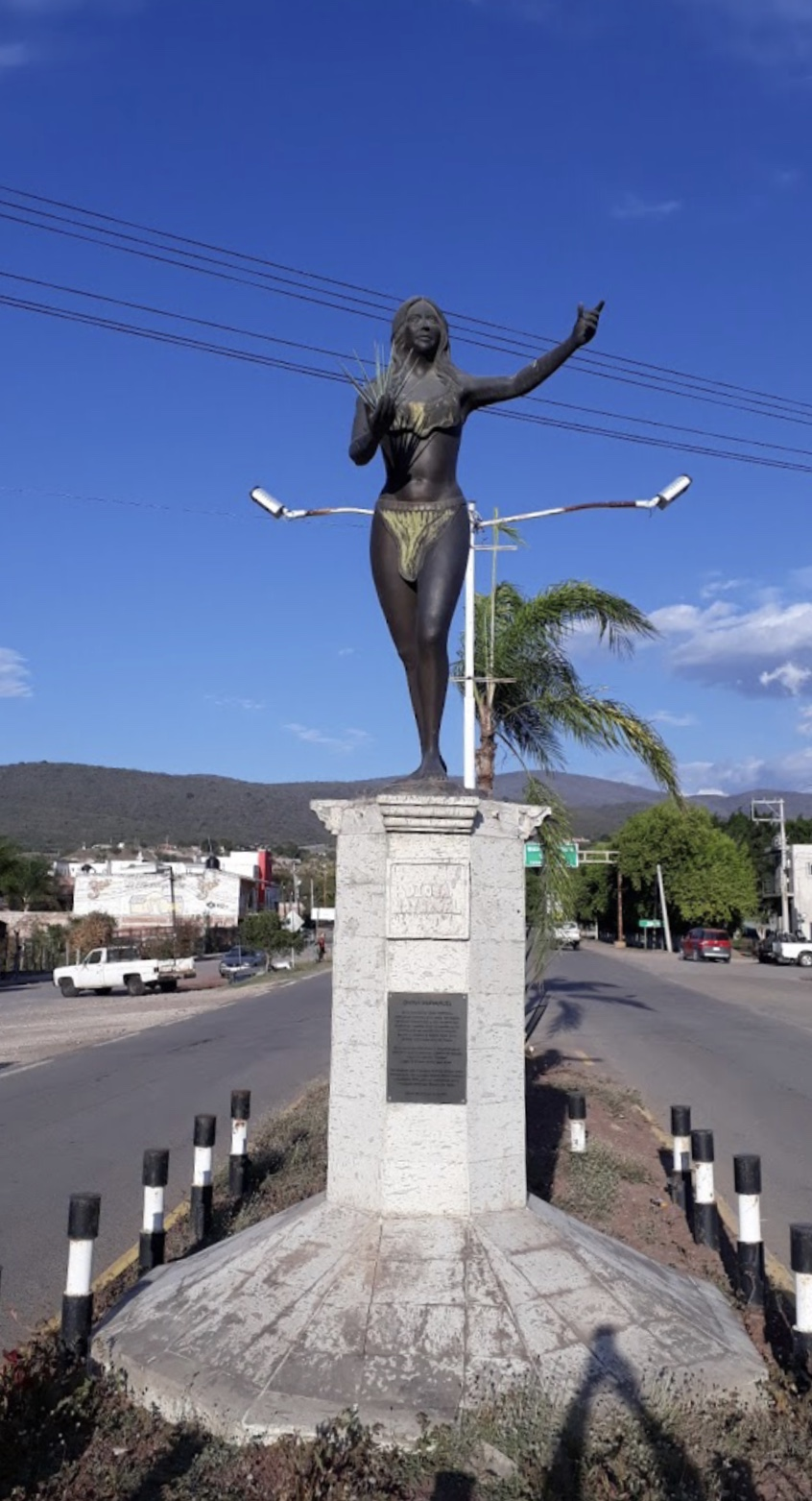
La Diosa del Agave Statue

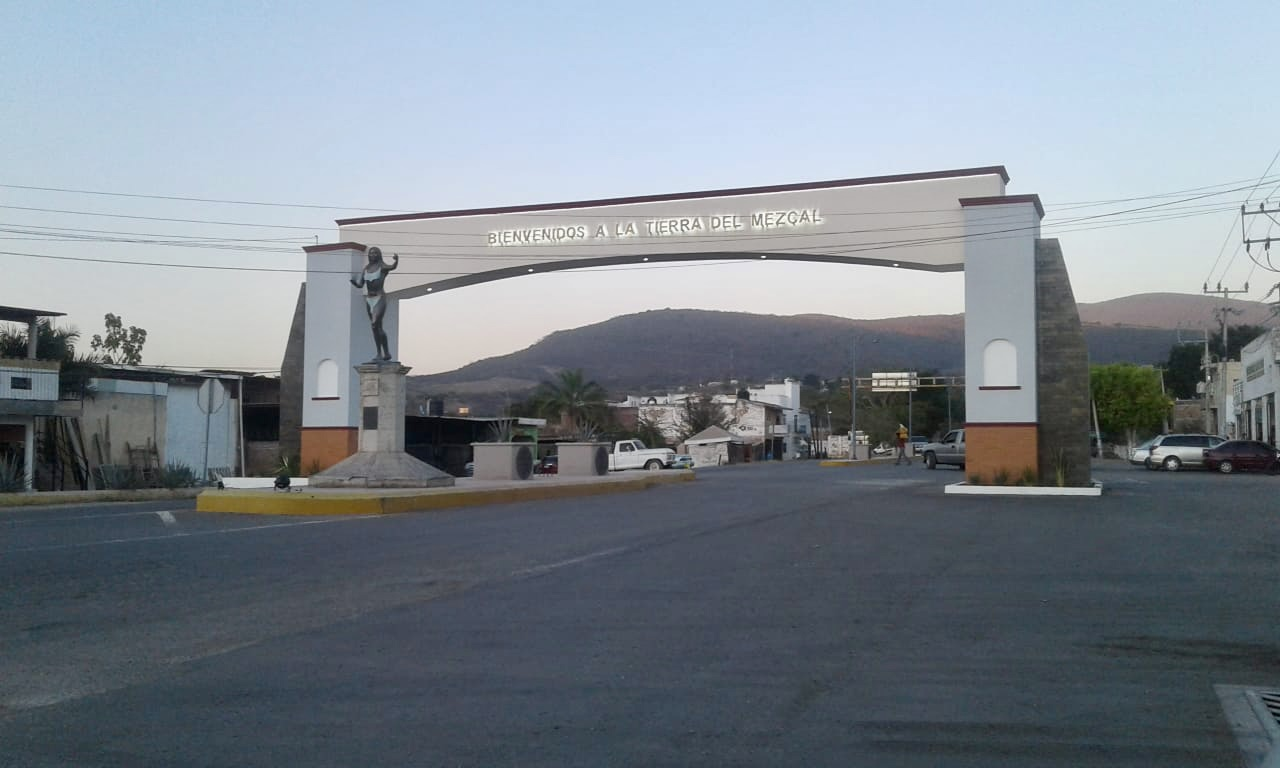
“Bienvenidos a la tierra del Mezcal” Welcome Sign
