= Ejutla, Jalisco =

Ejutla
- Municipality and town
- Coat of arms

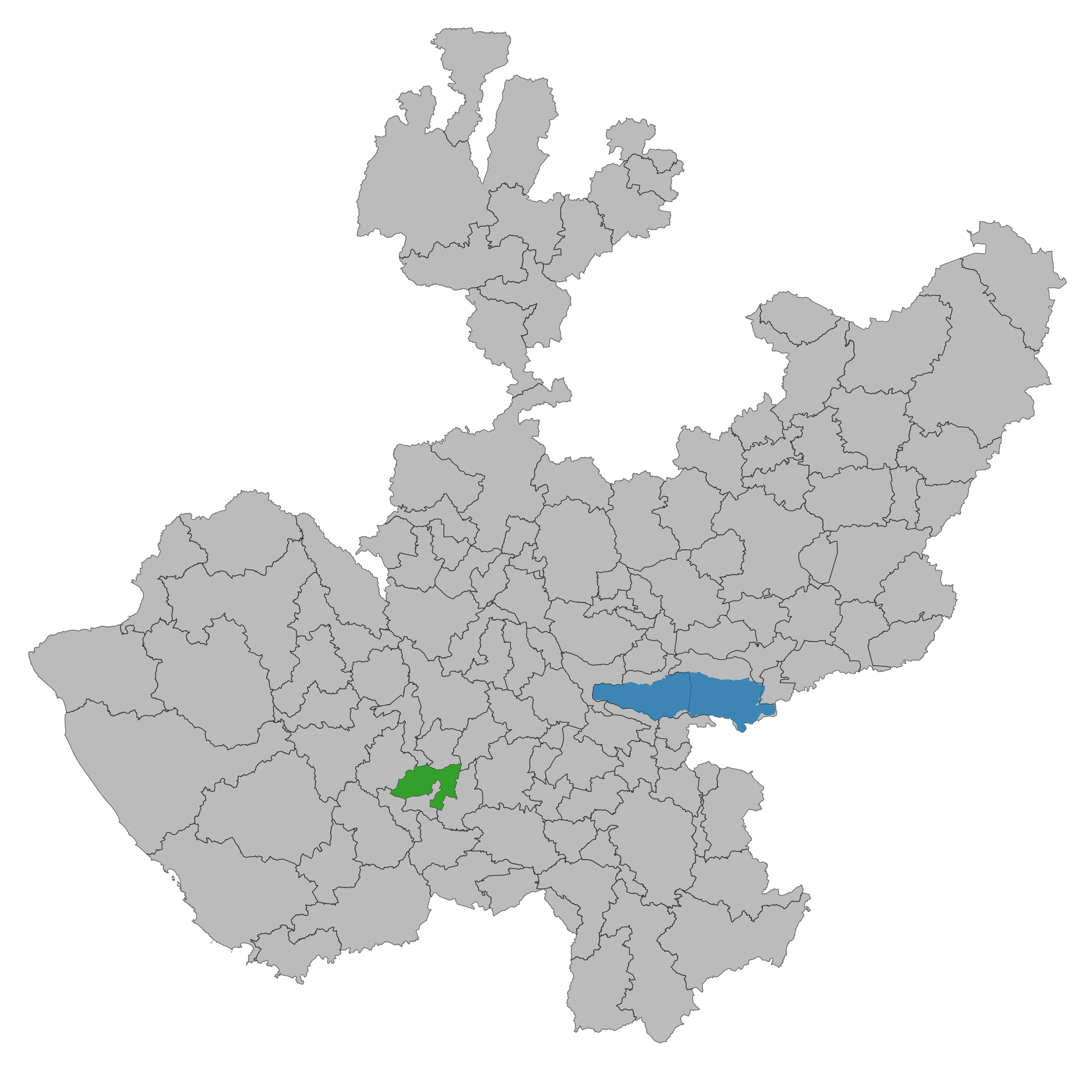
- Location of the municipality in Jalisco

- Location in Mexico
- Coordinates: 19°54′N 104°09′W
- Country: Mexico
- State: Jalisco
- Established: 1544

Area
  - Total: 297.6 km^{2} (114.9 sq mi)
  - Town: 0.96 km^{2} (0.37 sq mi)

Population (2020 census)
  - Total: 1,981
  - Density: 6.657/km^{2} (17.24/sq mi)
  - Town: 1,367
  - Town density: 1,400/km^{2} (3,700/sq mi)

Ejutla (Spanish pronunciation: [eˈxutla]) is a town and municipality, founded in 1544 in Jalisco in central-western Mexico. Its name comes from the Náhuatl word "axutla" which means "where the water springs". The municipality covers an area of 297.6 km^{2}.

As of 2005, the municipality had a total population of 1,888.
