= El Grullo =

El Grullo, Jalisco
- Municipality and city
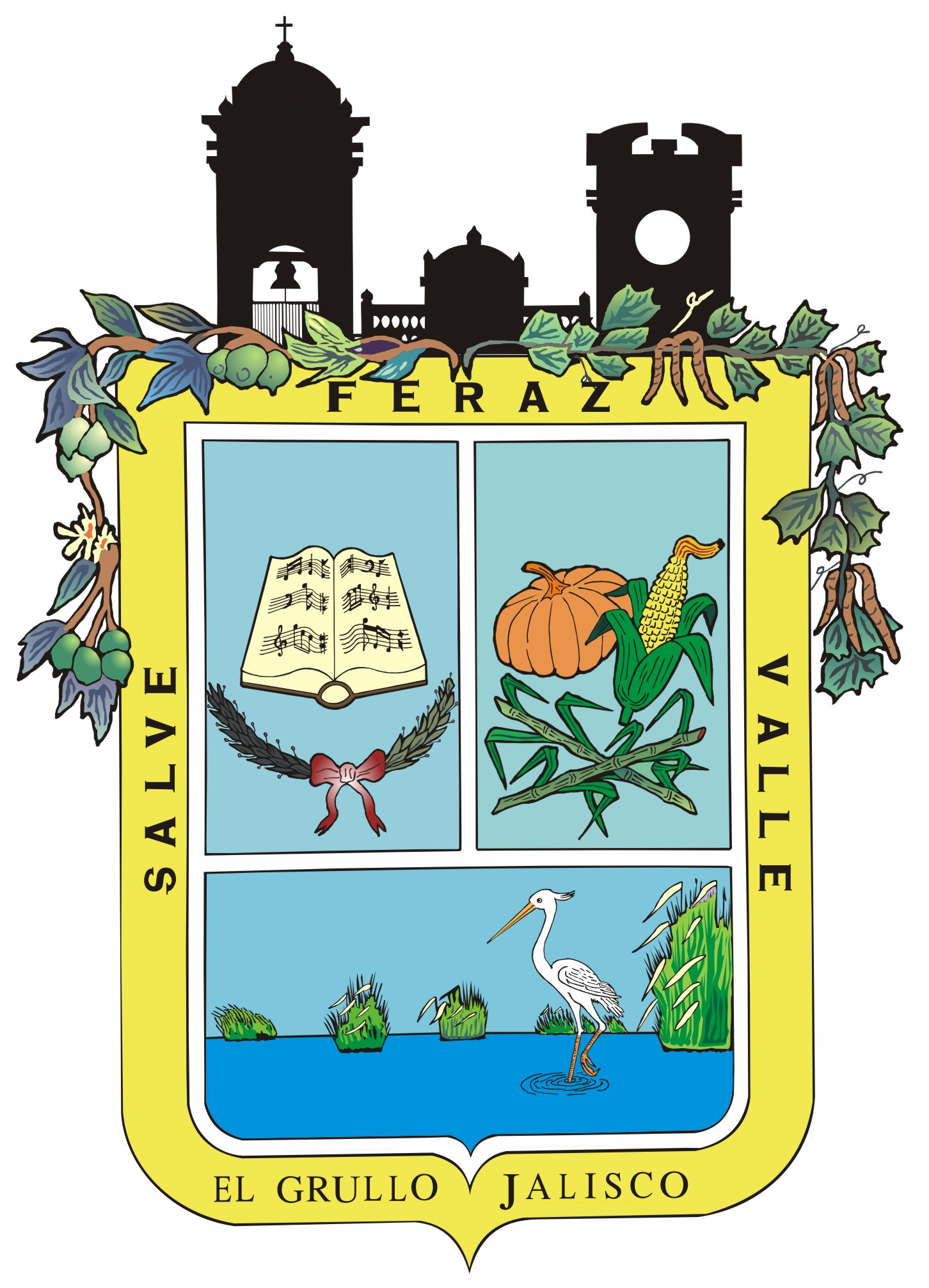
- Coat of arms

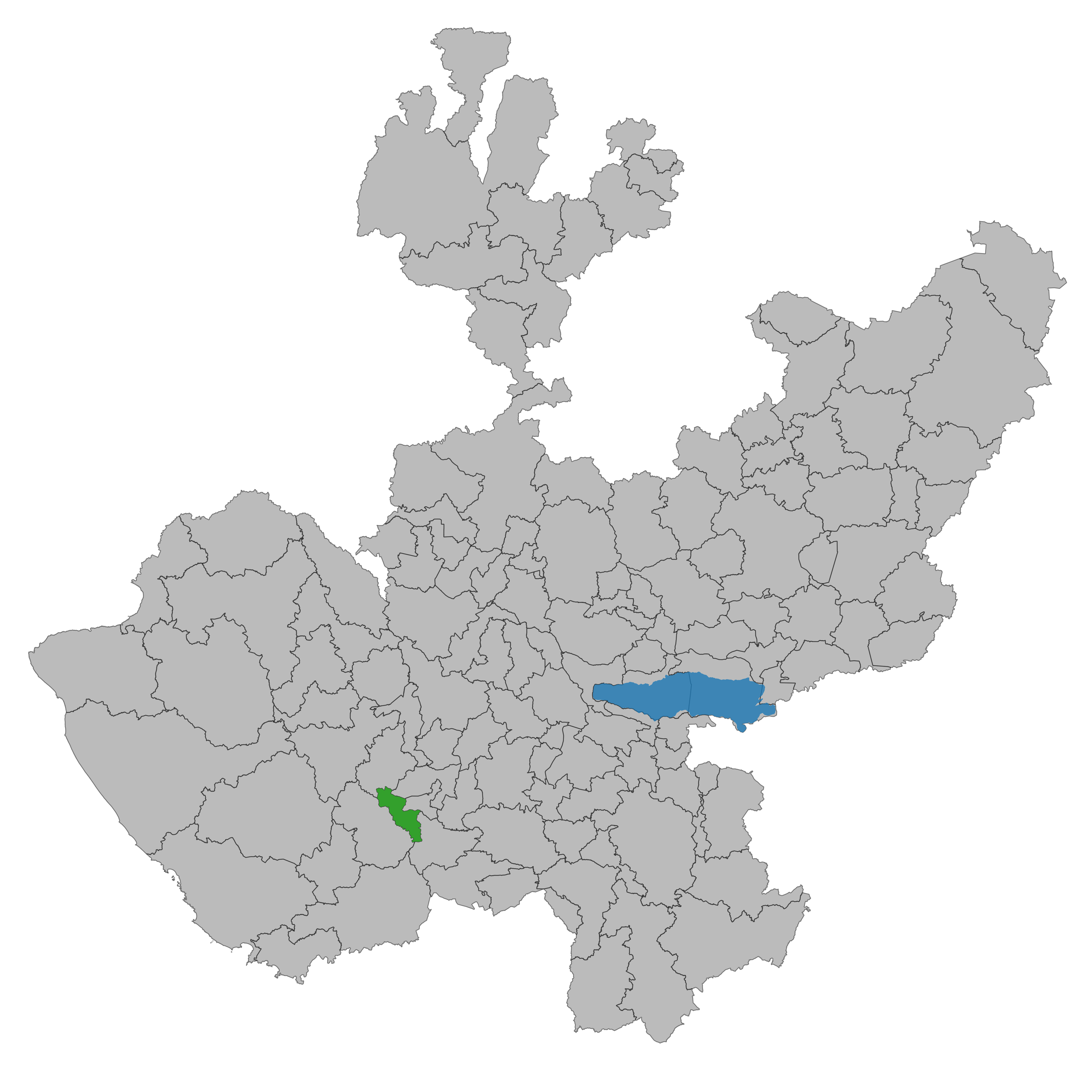
- Location of the municipality in Jalisco

- Location in Mexico
- Coordinates: 19°48′20″N 104°13′00″W
- Country: Mexico
- State: Jalisco

Area
  - Total: 157.2 km^{2} (60.7 sq mi)

Population (2005)
  - Total: 21,825

El Grullo is a town and municipality, in Jalisco in central-western Mexico. The municipality covers an area of 157.2 km^{2}. It is named for a color, used for horses and grass, called grullo, used as the name of an Hacienda established there: "La Hacienda del Zacate Grullo".

As of 2005, the municipality had a total population of 21,825.

In recent years, the town of El Grullo has begun expanding and now has begun to construct suburban-style housing developments on the outer limits of the town. There have also been new points of interest adding in the town center such as an obelisk, a larger city hall, and accessible WiFi throughout the town center. As of 2014, there are about 30,000 residents living in the developing city limits.
