= Autlán =

- City and municipality
- Flag Coat of arms

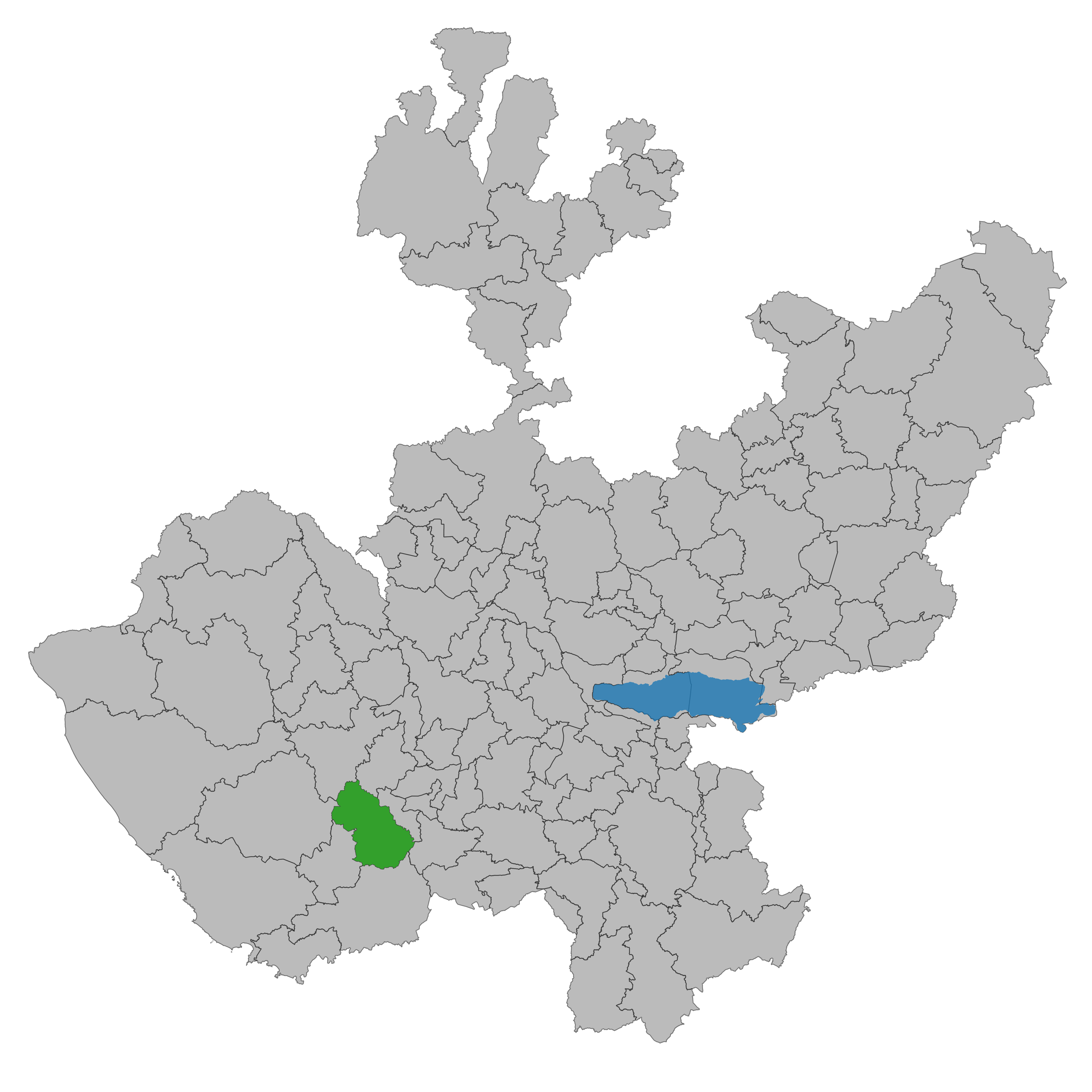
- Municipality location in Jalisco

- Location in Mexico Autlán (Mexico)
- Coordinates: 19°46′N 104°22′W
- Country: Mexico
- State: Jalisco

Government
  - Municipal president: Gustavo Robles Martínez

Area
  - City: 17.69 km^{2} (6.83 sq mi)
  - Municipality: 705.1 km^{2} (272.2 sq mi)

Population (2020 census)
  - City: 52,019
  - Density: 2,941/km^{2} (7,616/sq mi)
  - Municipality: 64,931
- Time zone: UTC-6 (Central (US Central))

Autlán de Navarro is a city and its surrounding municipality of the same name in the Costa Sur region of the southwestern part of the state of Jalisco in Mexico. At the Mexican census of 2005, the municipality had a population of 53,269. In 2010, the population had increased up to approximately 108,427, including all its delegations. The municipality has a surface area of 705.1 km^{2}. It is located 192 kilometers away from the Guadalajara metropolitan area and 165 kilometers from Manzanillo, Colima. This department capital is the most populated and largest city of the Costa Sur region. It is a leader district in the region since, Autlán is an important commercial exchange center. On September 12, 2014, the Autlán municipality was vouched for by the Congress of the Union.

Two recent mayors were Fernando Morán Guzmán (2010–2012) and Fabricio Israel Corona Vizcarra (2015–2018).

The name comes from the Nahuatl language, Aotli (water way, water channel or water ditch) and Tlan (place of or near) and means "next to the water ditch."

== Notable people ==
- Carlos Santana and his brother Jorge Santana, musicians.
- Luz Ramos, Mexican television actress and film actress
