= Lagunas Region =

- Region
- #11-Lagunas Region
- Country: Mexico
- State: Jalisco
- Largest city: Sayula

Area
  - Total: 3,743 km^{2} (1,445 sq mi)

Population (2020)
  - Total: 227,886
- Time zone: UTC−6 (CST)

The Lagunas region is one of the regions of the Mexican state of Jalisco. It comprises 12 municipalities and had a population of 227,886 in 2020.

== Municipalities ==
| Municipality code | Name | Population | | Land area | | | Population density | |
| Municipality code | Name | 2020 | Rank | km^{2} | sq mi | Rank | 2020 | Rank |
|---|---|---|---|---|---|---|---|---|
| 002 | Acatlán de Juárez | 25,250 | 5 | 181 | 70 | 10 | 140/km^{2} (361/sq mi) | 1 |
| 004 | Amacueca | 5,743 | 11 | 132 | 51 | 11 | 44/km^{2} (113/sq mi) | 8 |
| 010 | Atemajac de Brizuela | 7,758 | 10 | 342 | 132 | 7 | 23/km^{2} (59/sq mi) | 11 |
| 014 | Ayotac | 8,689 | 9 | 401 | 155 | 2 | 22/km^{2} (56/sq mi) | 12 |
| 024 | Cocula | 29,267 | 3 | 348 | 134 | 6 | 84/km^{2} (218/sq mi) | 4 |
| 077 | San Martín de Hidalgo | 28,102 | 4 | 292 | 113 | 8 | 96/km^{2} (249/sq mi) | 3 |
| 082 | Sayula | 37,186 | 1 | 287 | 111 | 9 | 130/km^{2} (336/sq mi) | 2 |
| 086 | Tapalpa | 21,245 | 6 | 582 | 225 | 1 | 37/km^{2} (95/sq mi) | 9 |
| 089 | Techaluta de Montenegro | 4,072 | 12 | 80 | 31 | 12 | 51/km^{2} (132/sq mi) | 7 |
| 092 | Teocuitatlán de Corona | 11,039 | 8 | 354 | 137 | 5 | 31/km^{2} (81/sq mi) | 10 |
| 114 | Villa Corona | 19,063 | 7 | 358 | 138 | 4 | 53/km^{2} (138/sq mi) | 6 |
| 119 | Zacoalco de Torres | 30,472 | 2 | 386 | 149 | 3 | 79/km^{2} (204/sq mi) | 5 |
| | Lagunas Region | 227,886 | — | 3,743 | 1,445.18 | — | 61/km^{2} (158/sq mi) | — |
Source: INEGI

=== Largest cities ===
Largest cities or towns in Lagunas Region Source:
| Rank | | Municipality | Pop. |
|---|---|---|---|
| 1 | Sayula | Sayula | 28,145 |
| 2 | Zacoalco de Torres | Zacoalco de Torres | 20,345 |
| 3 | Cocula | Cocula | 16,550 |
| 4 | Acatlán de Juárez | Acatlán de Juárez | 11,110 |
| 5 | San Martín de Hidalgo | San Martín de Hidalgo | 8,850 |
| 6 | Villa Corona | Villa Corona | 8,485 |
| 7 | Usmajac | Sayula | 8,317 |
| 8 | Bellavista | Acatlán de Juárez | 7,802 |
| 9 | Atemajac de Brizuela | Atemajac de Brizuela | 6,434 |
| 10 | Tapalpa | Tapalpa | 5,955 |
