= Región Costa Sur, Jalisco =

Región Costa Sur
- Region
- #8-Costa Sur Region
- Country: Mexico
- State: Jalisco
- Largest city: Cihuatlán

Area
  - Total: 9,685 km^{2} (3,739 sq mi)

Population (2020)
  - Total: 150,240
- Time zone: UTC−6 (CST)

The Costa Sur region is one of the regions of the Mexican state of Jalisco. It is part of the coastal region of Jalisco, comprising six municipalities with a population of 150,240 as of 2020.

== Municipalities ==
Municipality code	Name	Population		Land Area			Population density	
Municipality code	Name	2020	Rank	km^{2}	sq mi	Rank	2020	Rank
021	Casimiro Castillo	20,584	4	529	204	6	39/km^{2} (101/sq mi)	2
022	Cihuatlán	40,139	1	696	269	5	58/km^{2} (149/sq mi)	1
027	Cuautitlán de García Barragán	18,370	5	1,361	525	4	13/km^{2} (35/sq mi)	3
043	La Huerta	23,528	3	2,043	789	2	12/km^{2} (30/sq mi)	4
100	Tomatlán	36,316	2	3,240	1,250	1	11/km^{2} (29/sq mi)	5
068	Villa Purificación	11,303	6	1,789	691	3	6/km^{2} (16/sq mi)	6
	Costa Sur Region	150,240	—	9,685	3,739.40	—	16/km^{2} (40/sq mi)	—
Source: INEGI

=== Largest cities ===
Largest cities or towns in Costa Sur Region Source:
Rank		Municipality	Pop.
1	Cihuatlán	Cihuatlán	18,787
2	La Resolana	Casimiro Castillo	11,543
3	Tomatlán	Tomatlán	9,842
4	La Huerta	La Huerta	7,954
5	Melaque	Cihuatlán	6,958
6	Villa Purificación	Villa Purificación	5,965
7	Barra de Navidad	Cihuatlán	4,266
8	Jaluco	Cihuatlán	3,536
9	Jose María Morelos	Tomatlán	3,200
10	Jose María Pino Suárez	Tomatlán	3,160
