= Laguna de Sayula =

Lake in Mexico

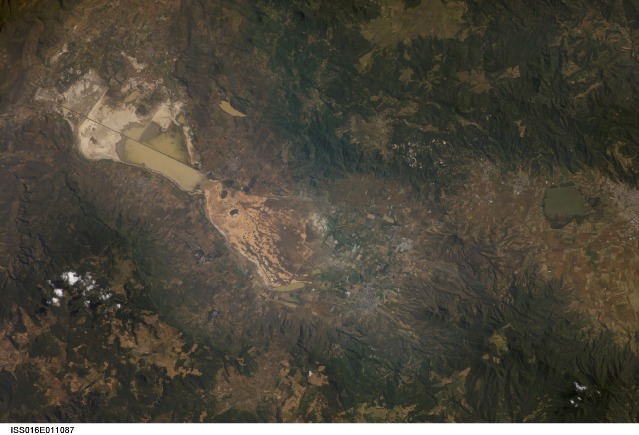
- Satellite image of Laguna de Sayula

- Location within Jalisco Location within Mexico
- Location: Jalisco, Sayula-Atotonilco river basin
- Coordinates: 20°05′58.62″N 103°28′31.05″W
- Primary inflows: Local rivers and springs
- Primary outflows: Natural evaporation
- Basin countries: Mexico
- Max. length: 31.17 km (19.37 mi)
- Surface area: 168 km^{2} (65 sq mi)
- Average depth: 2 m (6.6 ft)
- Max. depth: 8.34 m (27.4 ft)
- Surface elevation: 1,350 m (4,430 ft)

Ramsar Wetland
- Designated: 2 February 2004
- Reference no.: 1338

Laguna de Sayula ("Sayula Lake") is a lake located in the southern area of Jalisco, about 60 km from Guadalajara. It is located in the municipalities of Sayula, Zacoalco de Torres, Amacueca, Teocuitatlán de Corona, Atoyac and Techaluta de Montenegro.

The lake level has gradually been lowering since 1993 but it still supports a large variety of wildlife.

== Physical environment ==
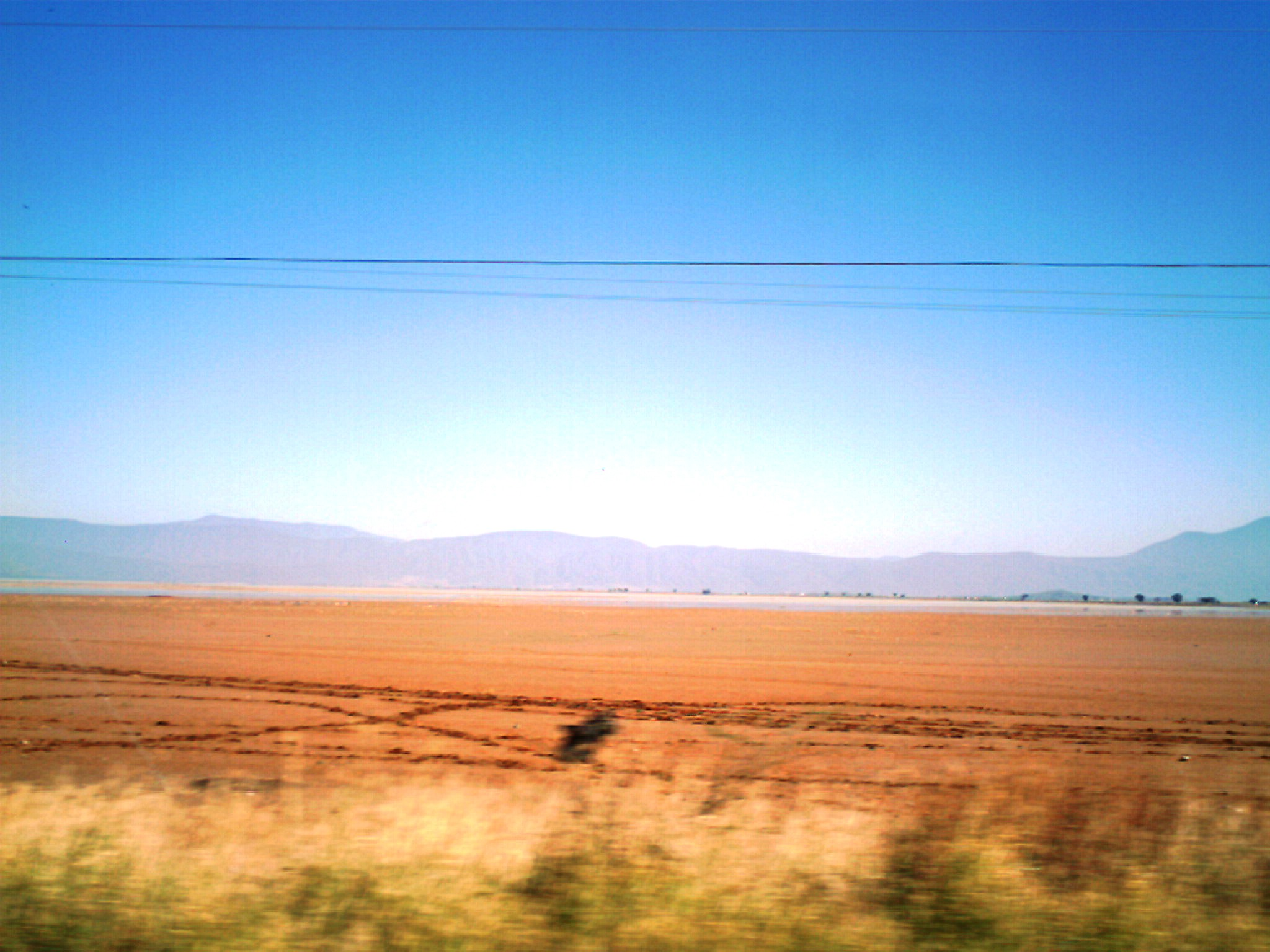
Laguna de Sayula.

=== Geographic location ===
Laguna de Sayula is found in the Zacoalco-Guzmán water system, right between the Tapalpa Mountains and the Mazamitla Mountains, in the central part of Southern Jalisco. The coordinates of its borders are:

- North 20°10′30.19″N 103°30′06.84″W
- West 19°57′20.70″N 103°36′41.53″W
- South 19°53′40.79″N 103°34′33.12″W
- East 20°05′58.62″N 103°28′31.05″W

It measures 168 km^{2} (65 sq mi) with a maximum width of 8.34 km (5.18 mi) and a minimum of 2 km (1.2 mi) and a maximum length of 31.17 km (19.37 mi) and an altitude of 1,350 m (4,430 ft) above sea level. The lake has two islands, called Isla Chica ("small island") and Isla Grande ("big island"), oval forms less than 1 km^{2} (0.39 sq mi). It has a coast approximately 90 km (56 mi) long and a depth of 2 metres (6 ft 7 in).

One finds the municipalities of Sayula, Amacueca, Techaluta de Montenegro, and Atoyac around the lake.

=== Hydrography of the lake ===
Laguna de Sayula is a wetland with Ramsar (an important place for bird conservation), the wetlands are ecosystems where water is the main factor controlling the environment, vegetable life and animals associated with it. The lakes of the closed Sayula-Atotonilco basin form part of the endorheic lakes of the neo-volcanic axis. But Laguna de Sayula is especially important because of its relation to the migratory habitats of the North American birds.

=== Flora ===
Because the lake is salty, the vegetation found nearby is highly tolerant to salt. Along with these, there are low-lying vegetation that surrounds the lake.. The aquatic plants found in the lake is sparse, and can only be found in small pockets of freshwater in the area. The tropical deciduous forest vegetation can be found in higher altitudes, atop of hills and islands on the lake.

The flora that can be found around the lake includes:

- Seashore saltgrass (Distichlis spicata and Sporobolus pyramidatus)
- Sea purslane (Sesuvium portulacastrum)
- Seepweeds (Suaeda torreyana)
- Smooth Mesquite (Prosopis laevigata)
- Madras Thorn (Pithecellobium dulce)
- Sweet Acacia (Acacia farnesiana)
- Southern cattail (Typha domingensis)
- Baraima (Bacopa monnieri)
- Fat Duckweed (Lemna gibba)
- Fragrant Bursera (Bursera fagaroides)
- Frangipani (Plumeria rubra)
- Isolatocereus dumortieri (Isolatocereus dumortieri)
- Cheilanthes sinuata (Cheilanthes sinuata)
- Cheilanthes lozanoi (Cheilanthes lozanoi)
- Mammillaria scrippsiana (Mammillaria scrippsiana)
- Ball Moss (Tillandsia recurvata)
- Ficus goldmanii (Ficus goldmanii)
- Ficus insipida (Ficus insipida)
- Ficus padifolia (Ficus padifolia)

=== Fauna ===
The wildlife found around the lake is very diverse; it is common to see birds in the winter, of the species Chen caerulescens, Chorlito tildío, and Charadrius vociferus, along with turtles, eagles, insects and hawks.
