= Battle of Guayabo =

Battle of El Guayabo
- Part of Second French intervention in Mexico
| Date | 10 November 1866 |
| Location | Tonila, Jalisco Mexico |
| Result | Mexican republican victory |

Belligerents
| (Mexico) Mexican Republicans | (France) French Empire |

Commanders and leaders
| (Mexico) Col. Julio García | (France) Col. Alfredo Berthelin † |

Casualties and losses
| Unknown | 70 killed |

The Battle of Paso El Guayabo (or Tonila) took place on the 10 November 1866 in the town of El Guayabo in Tonila, Jalisco Mexico, between the Mexican army of the Republic against the army of Second French Empire.

Colonel Alfredo Berthelin reached near Colima from Guadalajara in order to eliminate the guerrillas of Colonel Julio García. Colonel Garcia knew about plans of the French colonel, he divided his forces commissioning the main column to Ignacio Zepeda.

Spotted the forefront of forces Berthelin, some shots were exchanged while Zepeda simulated flight of the Mexican forces. His pursuers felt in the trap set. After several hours of fighting the Republicans were victorious. In the combat around 70 French died, including Berthelin.

== Bibliography ==
- Romero, José Miguel (1994). Breve historia de Colima (in Spanish). Fondo de Cultura Económica.
