= Atotonilco =

Atotonilco is the name of several towns in Mexico.

Atotonilco may refer to:

- Sanctuary of Atotonilco, Guanajuato, near San Miguel de Allende
- Atotonilco de Tula, Hidalgo
- Atotonilco El Alto, Jalisco
- Atotonilco El Grande, Hidalgo
- Atotonilco el Bajo, Jalisco
