= Tolimán, Jalisco =

Tolimán
- Municipality and town
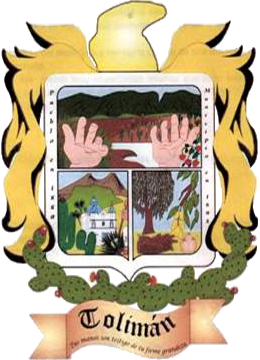
- Coat of arms

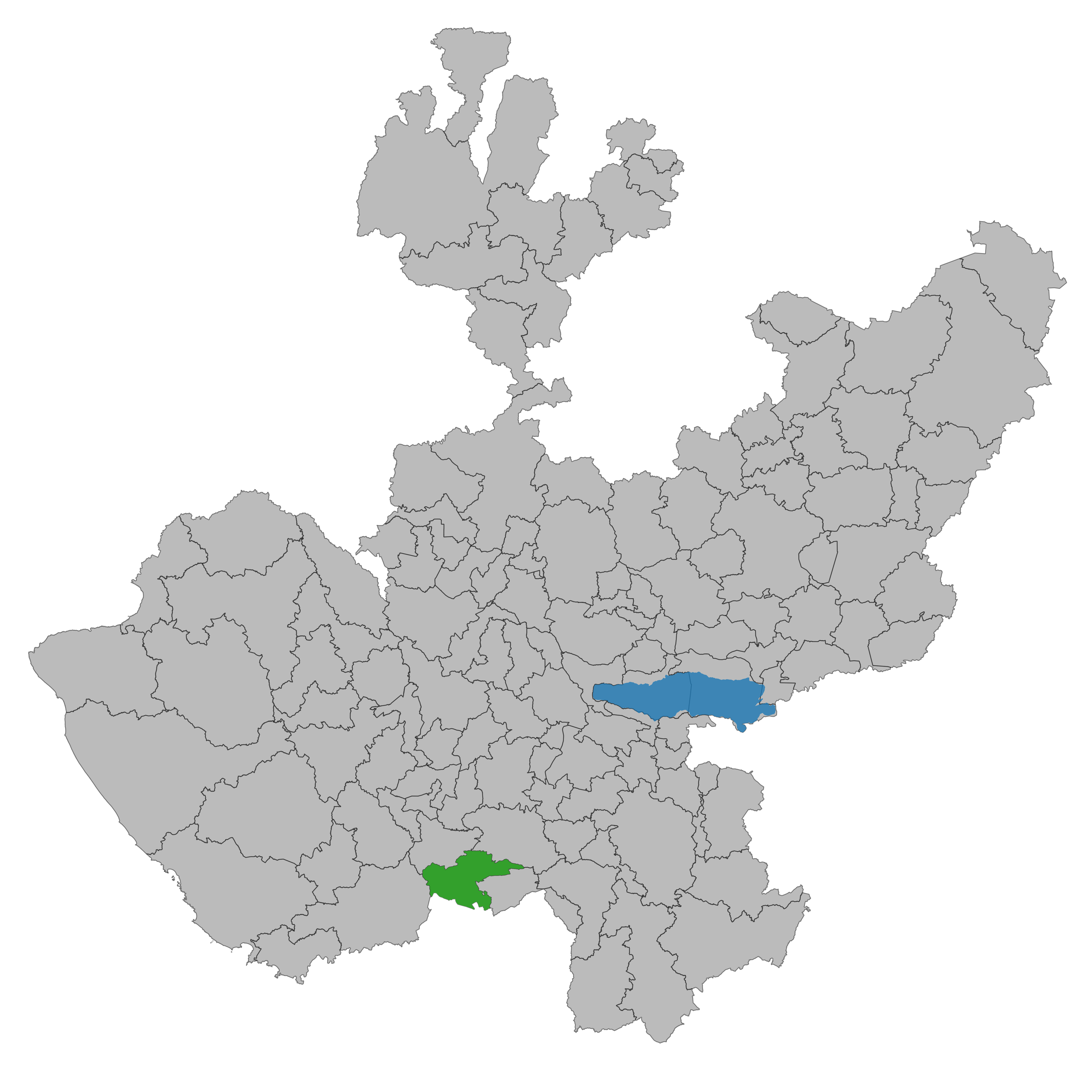
- Location of the municipality in Jalisco

- Location in Mexico
- Coordinates: 19°24′N 103°44′W
- Country: Mexico
- State: Jalisco

Area
  - Total: 512.6 km^{2} (197.9 sq mi)
  - Town: 0.91 km^{2} (0.35 sq mi)

Population (2020 census)
  - Total: 11,219
  - Density: 21.89/km^{2} (56.69/sq mi)
  - Town: 1,451
  - Town density: 1,600/km^{2} (4,100/sq mi)
- Time zone: UTC-6 (Central Standard Time)

Tolimán is a town and municipality, in Jalisco in central-western Mexico. The municipality covers an area of 512.6 km^{2}.

As of 2005, the municipality had a total population of 8,756.
