= Ejutla =

Ejutla may refer to:

- Ejutla de Crespo, Oaxaca, Mexico
- Ejutla, Jalisco, Mexico
