= Hostotipaquillo =

- Municipality and town
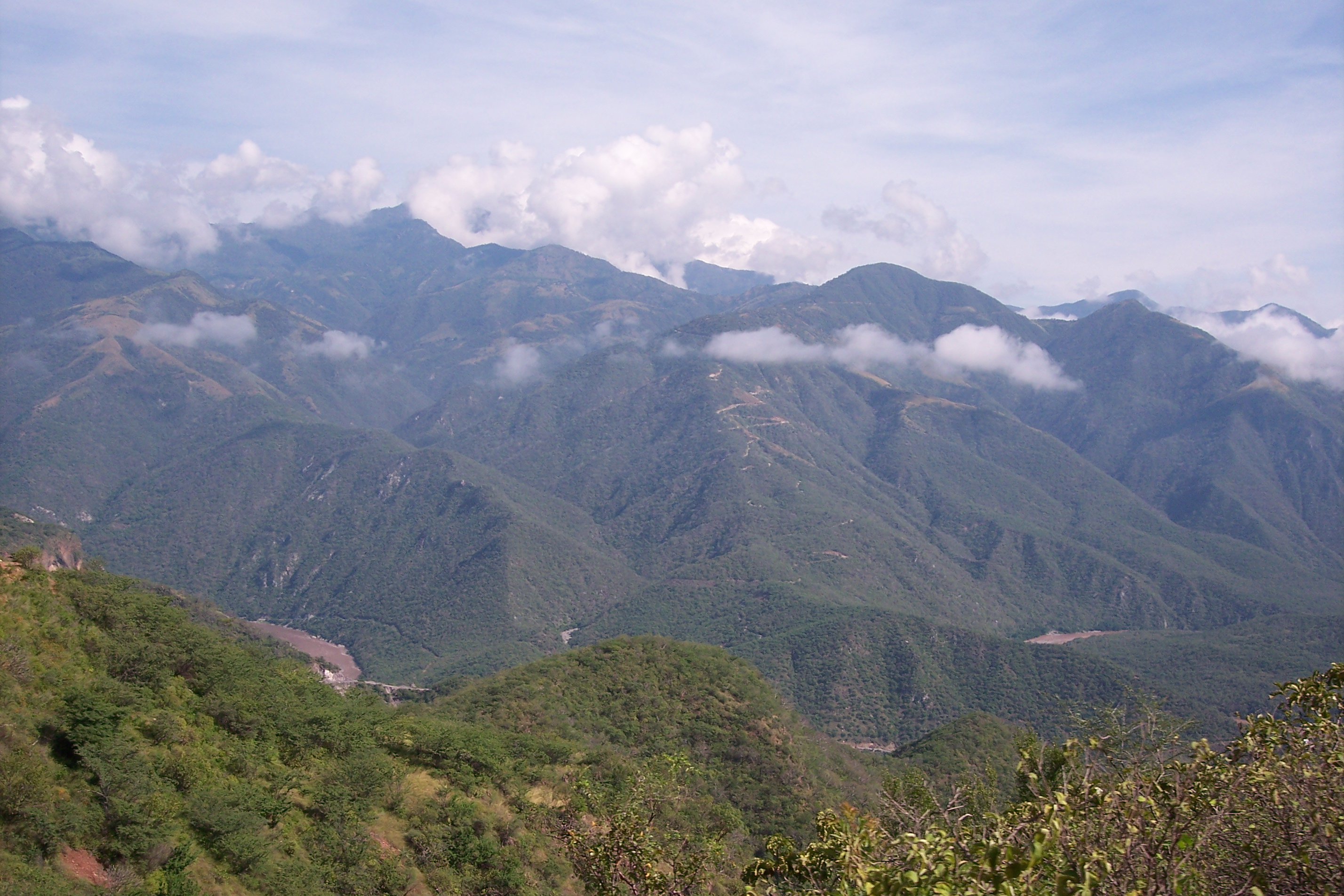
- Sierra Madre Occidental

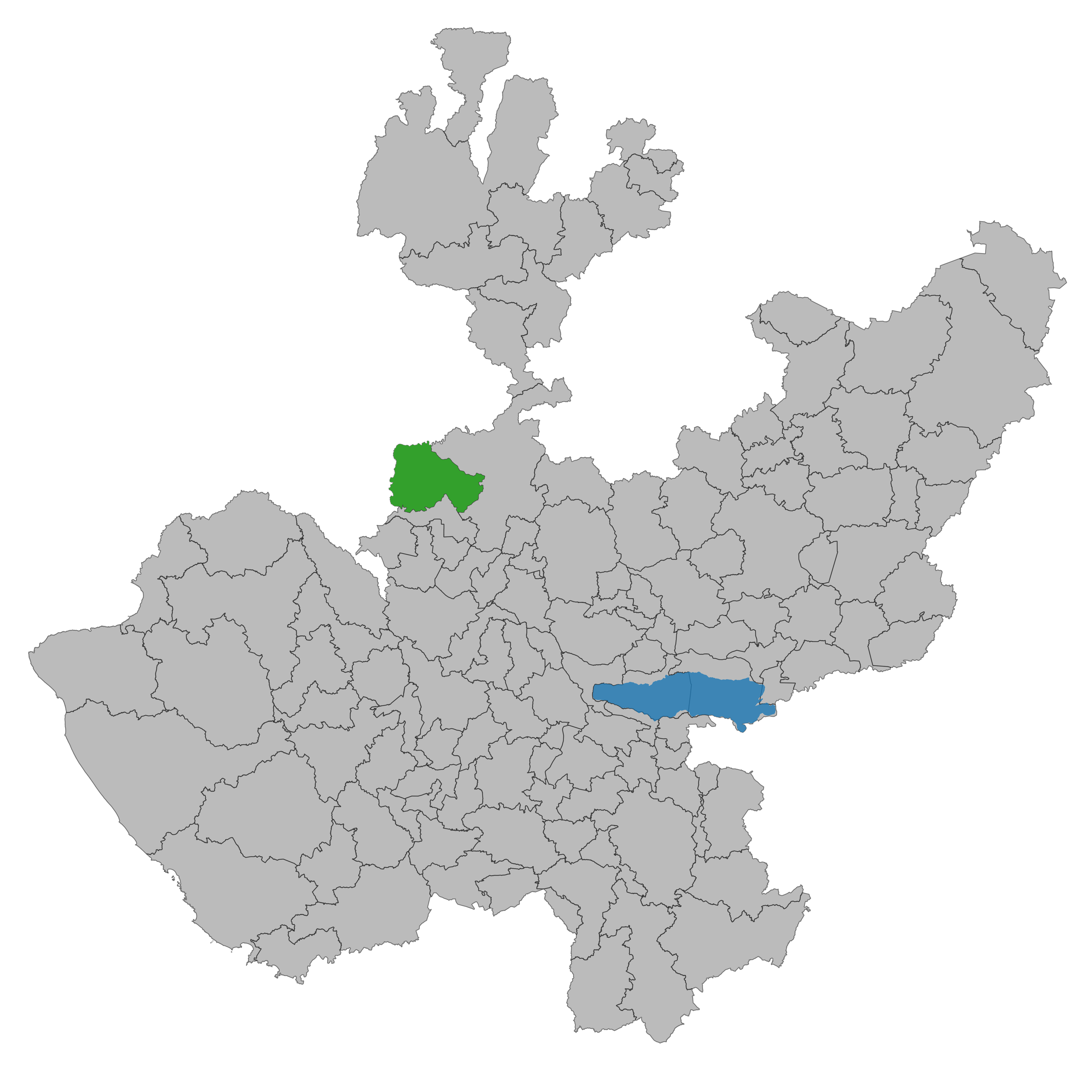
- Location of the municipality in Jalisco

- Location in Jalisco Location in Mexico
- Coordinates: 21°13′N 103°51′W
- Country: Mexico
- State: Jalisco

Area
  - Total: 756.4 km^{2} (292.0 sq mi)
  - Town: 1.27 km^{2} (0.49 sq mi)

Population (2020 census)
  - Total: 8,732
  - Density: 11.54/km^{2} (29.90/sq mi)
  - Town: 3,500
  - Town density: 2,800/km^{2} (7,100/sq mi)

Hostotipaquillo is a town and municipality, in Jalisco in central-western Mexico. The municipality covers an area of 756.4 km^{2}.

As of 2005, the municipality had a total population of 8,228.

== Government ==
=== Municipal presidents ===
Term	Municipal president	Political party	Notes
1927	Leopoldo González		
1927	Manuel V. Rodríguez		
1929	Alberto Plascencia		
1929	Diego Flores	PNR	
1930	José F. Díaz	PNR	
1930	Dionisio López	PNR	
1931	Irineo Meza	PNR	
1933	Norberto Hernández	PNR	
1934	J. Jesús Jaramillo	PNR	
1934	Juan R. García	PNR	
1935	Juan Reyes	PNR	
1936	J. Jesús Ramírez	PNR	
1936	Miguel Ayón	PNR	
1937	J. Jesús Ramírez	PNR	
1937	Manuel Castañeda	PNR	
1938-1940	Zenón Vallarta	PRM	
1940	J. Concepción Martínez	PRM	
1940	Esteban Vallarta	PRM	
1941	José M. Haro	PRM	
1942	José Ruiz Rodríguez	PRM	
1942	José M. Haro	PRM	
1942	Rufino Guerrero	PRM	
1942	J. Jesús Carrillo	PRM	
1942	Rufino Guerrero	PRM	
1943	Tomás Mojarro	PRM	
1943	Urbano L. Varela	PRM	
1944	José Velázquez	PRM	
1944	Ricardo León	PRM	
1945	Bernardo Arce Jiménez	PRM	
1945	Francisco Miramontes	PRM	
1946	Benjamín Hernández Rubio	PRI	
1947	José Ruiz Rodríguez	PRI	
1947	Leopoldo González	PRI	
1947	José Ruiz Rodríguez	PRI	
1947	Aurelio de la Torre D.	PRI	
1947-1948	José Ruiz Rodríguez	PRI	
1948	Leopoldo González	PRI	
1948	Pedro Palacios Carrillo	PRI	
1948	José Ruiz Rodríguez	PRI	
1949	Catarino Castillo	PRI	
1949-1950	Bernardo Arce Jiménez	PRI	
1950	Catarino Castillo	PRI	
1950	Zenón Vallarta Hernández	PRI	
1950	José Hernández Rubio	PRI	
1951	Zenón Vallarta Hernández	PRI	
1951	José Hernández Rubio	PRI	
1952	Rafael Becerra Castillo	PRI	
1953-1954	Isidro Sánchez Villa	PRI	
1954	Prudencio Gutiérrez	PRI	
1956-1958	Antonio Hernández Rubio	PRI	
1959	J. Sóstenes León R.	PRI	
1960-1961	Primitivo Ávila Leal	PRI	
1962-1964	Zenón González Ventura	PRI	
1971-1973	Ramón Martínez León	PRI	
1974-1976	Dimas Virgen Virgen	PRI	
1977-1979	Luis Miguel García A.	PRI	
1980-1982	Cirilo Vega Gutiérrez	PRI	
1983-1985	Francisco Javier León Ruiz	PRI	
1986-1988	Rafael Rojas Piz	PRI	
1989-1992	Ciriaco Mejía Mora	PRI	
1992-1995	José de Jesús Caldera Rubio	PRI	
1995-1997	Abraham Rodríguez Gómez	PRI	
1998-2000	Manuel Torres Flores	PRI	
2001-2003	Higinio Santillán García	PRI	
2004-2006	Hugo Daniel Gaeta Esparza	PRI	
2006-2009	Hugo Moreno Miramontes	PAN	
2010-2012	Jorge Armando León Rosales	PRD	
2013-2015	Luis Antonio León Ruiz	PRI	
2015-2018	Luis Alberto Camacho Flores	PRI	
2018-2021	Iliana Cristina Esparza Ríos	PAN; PRD; MC	
2021-2024	Teresa de Jesús González Carmona	PAN	

== Climate ==
Climate data for Hostotipaquillo (1991–2020 normals, extremes 1939–present)
Month	Jan	Feb	Mar	Apr	May	Jun	Jul	Aug	Sep	Oct	Nov	Dec	Year
Record high °C (°F)	43 (109)	42 (108)	43.8 (110.8)	44 (111)	46 (115)	45 (113)	45 (113)	39 (102)	42 (108)	42 (108)	46 (115)	48 (118)	48 (118)
Mean daily maximum °C (°F)	28.3 (82.9)	29.2 (84.6)	31.1 (88.0)	32.7 (90.9)	33.4 (92.1)	32.7 (90.9)	30.5 (86.9)	30.2 (86.4)	30.2 (86.4)	30.0 (86.0)	28.8 (83.8)	27.9 (82.2)	30.4 (86.7)
Daily mean °C (°F)	19.8 (67.6)	20.4 (68.7)	21.6 (70.9)	23.1 (73.6)	24.2 (75.6)	24.6 (76.3)	23.3 (73.9)	23.3 (73.9)	23.2 (73.8)	22.6 (72.7)	21.0 (69.8)	19.7 (67.5)	22.2 (72.0)
Mean daily minimum °C (°F)	11.3 (52.3)	11.7 (53.1)	12.1 (53.8)	13.5 (56.3)	15.0 (59.0)	16.5 (61.7)	16.2 (61.2)	16.3 (61.3)	16.2 (61.2)	15.2 (59.4)	13.2 (55.8)	11.5 (52.7)	14.1 (57.4)
Record low °C (°F)	0.8 (33.4)	3 (37)	0.5 (32.9)	1.1 (34.0)	1.2 (34.2)	5 (41)	4 (39)	1.4 (34.5)	1.4 (34.5)	4 (39)	5 (41)	0.5 (32.9)	0.5 (32.9)
Average precipitation mm (inches)	21.0 (0.83)	7.8 (0.31)	7.0 (0.28)	5.0 (0.20)	11.3 (0.44)	135.9 (5.35)	212.6 (8.37)	185.2 (7.29)	138.5 (5.45)	62.8 (2.47)	19.8 (0.78)	11.2 (0.44)	818.1 (32.21)
Average precipitation days	2.0	1.0	0.7	0.7	1.4	10.0	14.9	14.1	11.2	4.6	1.7	1.6	63.9
Source: Servicio Meteorológico Nacional
