= Atotonilco el Bajo =

Coordinates: 20°20′N 103°40′W

Atotonilco el Bajo is a town in the municipality of Villa Corona; in the Mexican state of Jalisco. According to the INEGI census of 2000: 2,255 people resided in the town.

The meaning of Atotonilco comes from its Nahuatl roots: atotos which means "place", and nilco which means "strings of water".
