= Santa María de los Ángeles =

- Municipality and town
- Coat of arms

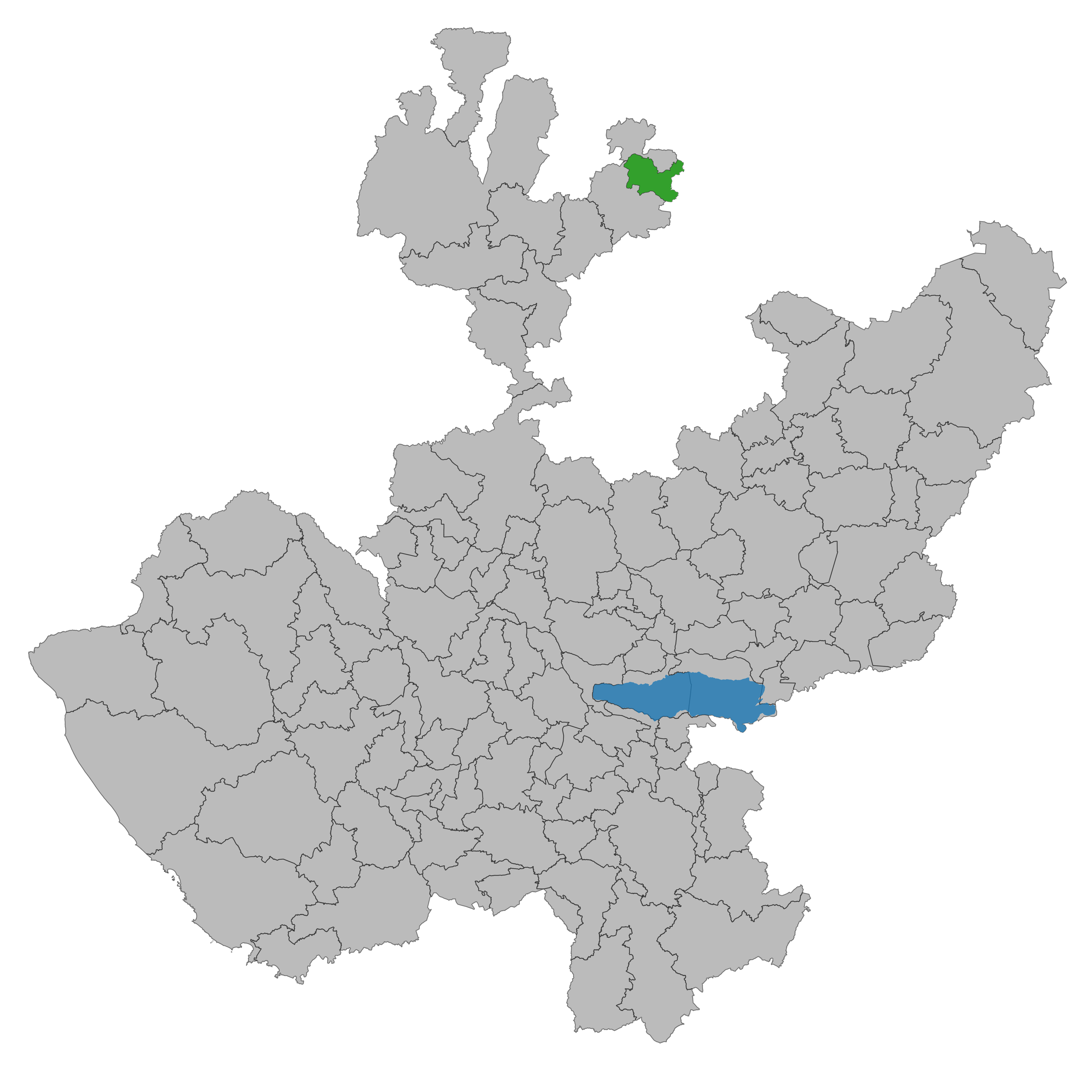
- Location of the municipality in Jalisco

- Location in Mexico
- Coordinates: 22°18′N 103°02′W
- Country: Mexico
- State: Jalisco

Area
  - Total: 260.8 km^{2} (100.7 sq mi)

Population (2021)
  - Total: 4,343
  - Density: 16.65/km^{2} (43.13/sq mi)
- Time zone: UTC-6 (Central Standard Time)

Santa María de los Ángeles is a town and municipality, in Jalisco in central-western Mexico. The municipality covers an area of 260.8 km^{2}.

As of 2005, the municipality had a total population of 3,687.

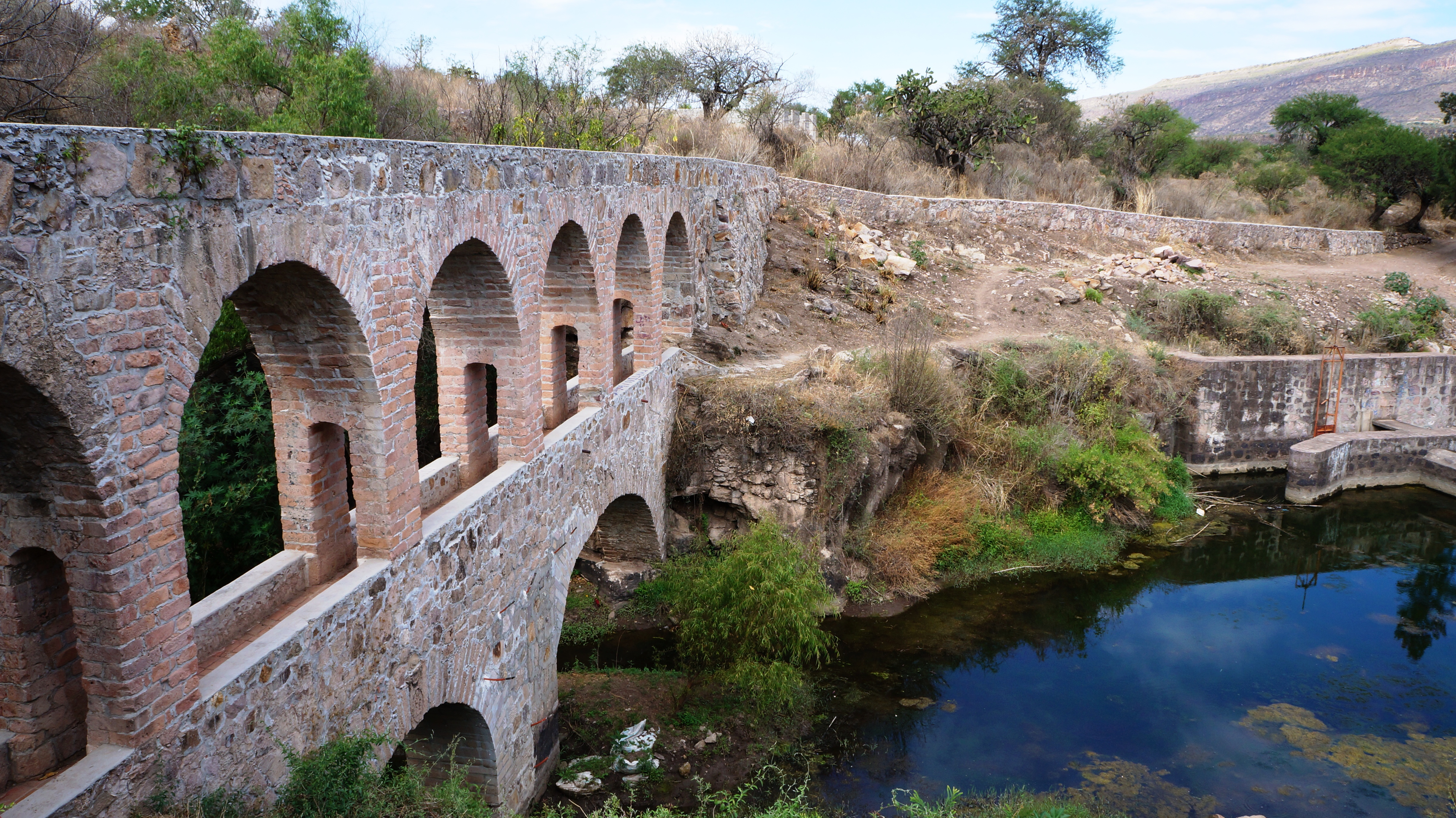
Old Aqueduct

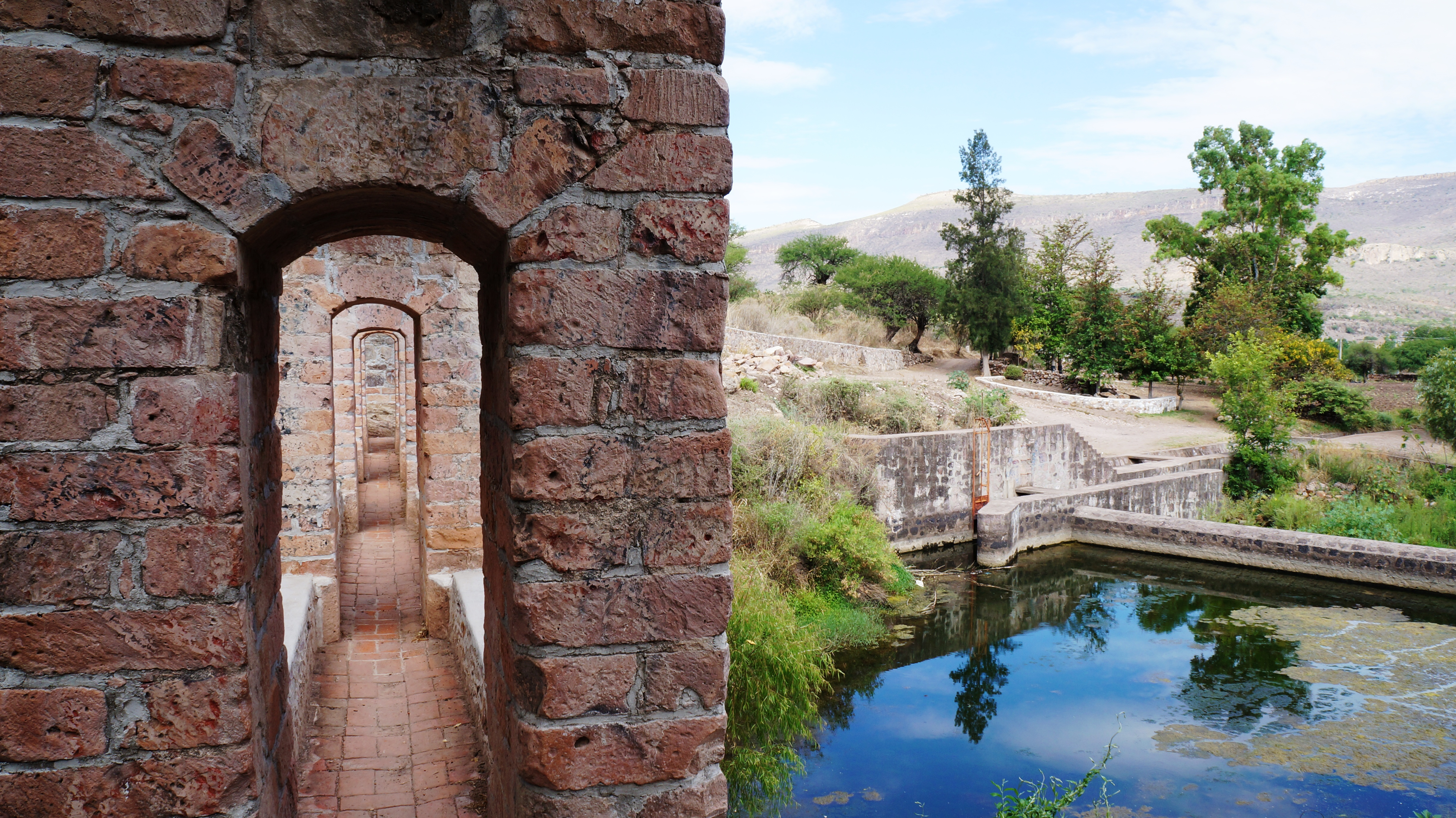
Arcs from the Aqueduct
