= Cuautitlán de García Barragán =

- Municipality and town
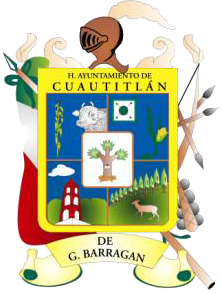
- Coat of arms

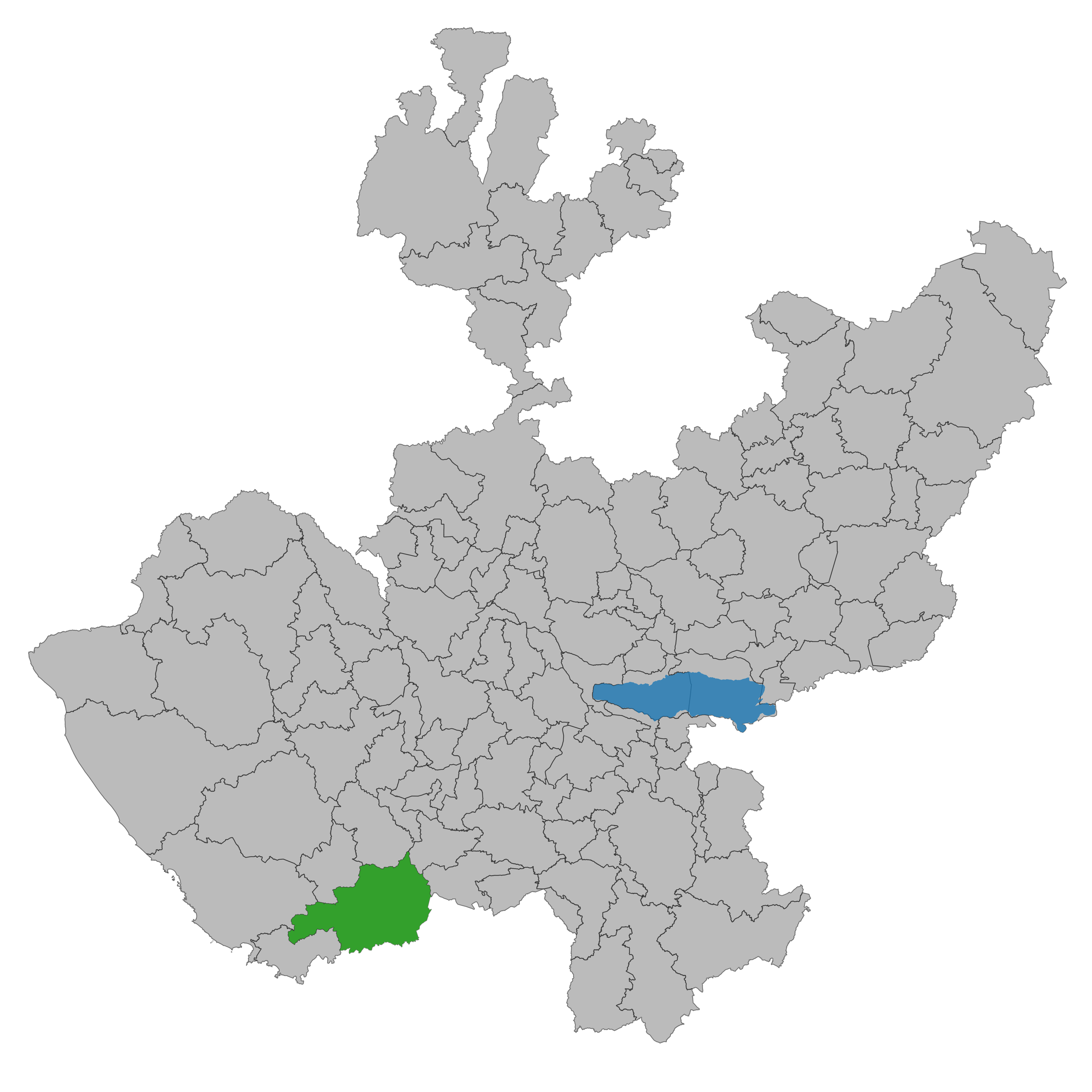
- Location of the municipality in Jalisco

- Location in Mexico
- Coordinates: 19°27′08″N 104°21′30″W
- Country: Mexico
- State: Jalisco

Area
  - Total: 1,391 km^{2} (537 sq mi)
  - Town: 1.37 km^{2} (0.53 sq mi)

Population (2020 census)
  - Total: 18,370
  - Density: 13.21/km^{2} (34.20/sq mi)
  - Town: 2,794
  - Town density: 2,040/km^{2} (5,280/sq mi)

Cuautitlán de García Barragán is a town and municipality in Jalisco in central-western Mexico. The municipality covers an area of 1,391 km^{2}.

As of 2005, the municipality had a total population of 16,408.

== Climate ==
Climate data for Cuautitlán De García Barragán (1991–2020 normals, extremes 1965–present)
Month	Jan	Feb	Mar	Apr	May	Jun	Jul	Aug	Sep	Oct	Nov	Dec	Year
Record high °C (°F)	47 (117)	46 (115)	43.5 (110.3)	44.5 (112.1)	45 (113)	44.5 (112.1)	43.5 (110.3)	44 (111)	45.5 (113.9)	44 (111)	44.5 (112.1)	46.5 (115.7)	47 (117)
Mean daily maximum °C (°F)	34.6 (94.3)	35.7 (96.3)	37.2 (99.0)	38.9 (102.0)	39.4 (102.9)	36.4 (97.5)	34.8 (94.6)	34.4 (93.9)	33.9 (93.0)	34.5 (94.1)	35.0 (95.0)	34.2 (93.6)	35.8 (96.4)
Daily mean °C (°F)	25.6 (78.1)	26.0 (78.8)	26.6 (79.9)	28.2 (82.8)	30.1 (86.2)	30.3 (86.5)	29.3 (84.7)	29.2 (84.6)	28.9 (84.0)	29.0 (84.2)	27.8 (82.0)	25.8 (78.4)	28.1 (82.6)
Mean daily minimum °C (°F)	16.5 (61.7)	16.3 (61.3)	16.0 (60.8)	17.4 (63.3)	20.7 (69.3)	24.3 (75.7)	23.9 (75.0)	24.0 (75.2)	23.9 (75.0)	23.4 (74.1)	20.6 (69.1)	17.4 (63.3)	20.4 (68.7)
Record low °C (°F)	0.5 (32.9)	1.5 (34.7)	1 (34)	5 (41)	8 (46)	4.5 (40.1)	13.5 (56.3)	13.5 (56.3)	13 (55)	3.5 (38.3)	6.5 (43.7)	0.5 (32.9)	0.5 (32.9)
Average precipitation mm (inches)	26.6 (1.05)	16.3 (0.64)	11.3 (0.44)	0.2 (0.01)	11.9 (0.47)	243.3 (9.58)	343.6 (13.53)	360.2 (14.18)	393.6 (15.50)	237.3 (9.34)	51.6 (2.03)	14.3 (0.56)	1,710.2 (67.33)
Average precipitation days	2.5	1.9	0.7	0.2	2.4	17.5	24.6	25.1	24.8	17.4	4.9	2.2	124.2
Source: Servicio Meteorológico Nacional
