= Tonila =

- Municipality and town
- Coat of arms

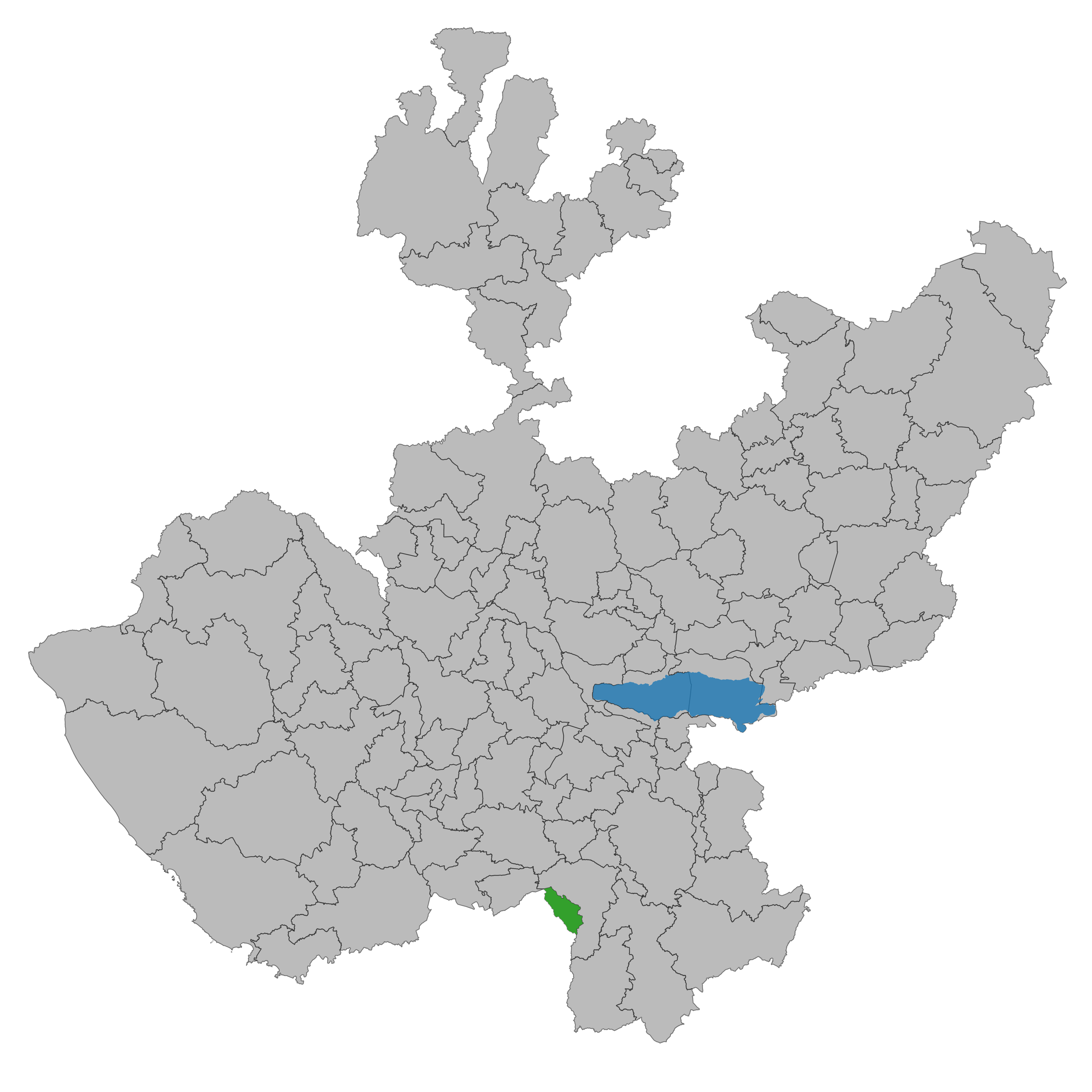
- Location of the municipality in Jalisco

- Location in Mexico
- Coordinates: 20°39′N 102°48′W
- Country: Mexico
- State: Jalisco

Area
  - Total: 145.9 km^{2} (56.3 sq mi)
  - Town: 1.67 km^{2} (0.64 sq mi)

Population (2005)
  - Total: 7,565
  - Density: 51.85/km^{2} (134.3/sq mi)
  - Town: 3,226
  - Town density: 1,930/km^{2} (5,000/sq mi)
- Time zone: UTC-6 (Central Standard Time)

Tonila is a town and municipality, in Jalisco in central-western Mexico.

== Government ==
=== Municipal presidents ===
| Term | Municipal president | Political party | Notes |
|---|---|---|---|
| 1929 | Cirilo A. Salcedo | | |
| 1930 | Carlos Chacón | PNR | |
| 1931-1932 | Antonio L. Martínez | PNR | |
| 1933 | Fernando Retolaza | PNR | |
| 1934-1935 | Antonio L. Martínez | PNR | |
| 1936 | Jehová Villa Michel | PNR | |
| 1937-1938 | Librado Cárdenas | PNR; PRM | |
| 1939-1940 | Flaviano Michel | PRM | |
| 1941-1942 | Librado Cárdenas | PRM | |
| 1943-1944 | Gabriel Mancilla Gómez | PRM | |
| 1945-1946 | Librado Cárdenas | PRM; PRI | |
| 1947-1948 | Antonio L. Martínez | PRI | |
| 1949-1951 | Silverio Amezcua | PRI | |
| 1952 | Rafael Rojas Montes | PRI | Acting municipal president |
| 1953-1954 | Rodolfo Alonso García | PRI | |
| 1955 | Federico Ramírez Navarro | PRI | Acting municipal president |
| 1956-1958 | J. Jesús Silva Ramírez | PRI | |
| 1959-1961 | Antonio Ramírez Ochoa | PRI | |
| 1962 | Enrique Anaya Ceballos | PRI | Acting municipal president |
| 1962-1964 | Manuel Quevedo Villa | PRI | |
| 1965-1967 | Ramiro Ramírez Ochoa | PRI | |
| 1968 | Librado Cárdenas | PRI | Acting municipal president |
| 1968-1970 | Agustín Quevedo Villa | PRI | |
| 1971-1973 | Francisco Javier Sánchez Urzúa | PRI | |
| 1974-1976 | Rosa María Lorenzana Rojas | PRI | |
| 1977-1979 | Rafael Sahagún Palafox | PRI | |
| 1980-1982 | Manuel Chávez Ortiz | PRI | |
| 1983-1985 | Irma Navarro Verduzco | PRI | |
| 1986-1988 | María Rosario Munguía Vicuña | PRI | |
| 1989-1992 | Luis Antonio Retolaza Zúñiga | PRI | |
| 1992-1995 | Héctor Manuel Anaya Silva | PRI | |
| 1995-1997 | Gustavo Magaña Negrete | PAN | |
| 1998-2000 | Ignacio Macías Zamora | PAN | |
| 2001-2003 | Sebastián García Cárdenas | PRI | |
| 2004-2006 | Sergio Antonio Retolaza Macías | PRI | |
| 2006-2009 | Raúl Heredia Magaña | PAN | |
| 2010-2012 | Sergio Antonio Retolaza Macías | PRI; Panal | |
| 2012-2015 | José Martín Hernández Álvarez | PAN | |
| 2015-2018 | Mario Harvey Chávez Bojórquez | PRI | |
| 2018-2021 | José Martín Hernández Álvarez | MC | Applied for a temporary leave to run for reelection |
| 2021 | Mario Iván Pérez Aguilar | MC | Acting municipal president |
| 2021- | José Martín Hernández Álvarez | MC | He was reelected on 06/06/2021 |
