= La Huerta, Jalisco =

La Huerta
- Municipality and town
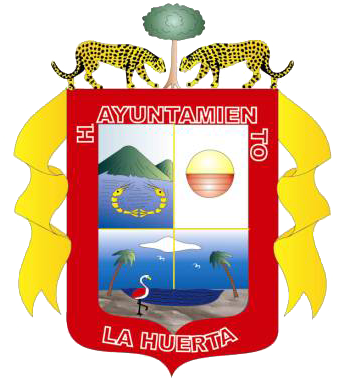
- Coat of arms

- Location of the municipality in Jalisco

- Location in Mexico
- Coordinates: 19°29′N 104°39′W
- Country: Mexico
- State: Jalisco

Area
  - Total: 2,011 km^{2} (776 sq mi)
  - Town: 4.29 km^{2} (1.66 sq mi)

Population (2020 census)
  - Total: 23,258
  - Density: 11.57/km^{2} (29.95/sq mi)
  - Town: 7,954
  - Town density: 1,850/km^{2} (4,800/sq mi)
- Time zone: UTC-6 (Central Standard Time)

La Huerta is a town and municipality in Jalisco in central-western Mexico. The municipality covers an area of 2,011 km^{2}.

As of 2005, the municipality had a total population of 20,161.

Its inhabitants, before the arrival of the Spaniards, were from Mazatlan. The first settlement of this town was on the hill west of what is now La Huerta, within a palm of coquito oil and next to an eye of water.

== Tourism ==
=== Historical monuments ===
A bust dedicated to Don Miguel Hidalgo y Costilla is located in the main garden. Parties: The Holy Family is celebrated in February; celebrations can be held on any Sunday of the month. The Bullfighting Fair is celebrated from December 13 to 27.

=== Music ===
Mariachi.

=== Crafts ===
The products of engraved shell, typical otate furniture, gun handles, textiles and embroidery stand out.

=== Gastronomy ===
Saucers are made of shrimp, octopus, fish, and jackal; cocadas, sweet potato, or orange are drunk. The region's fruit waters are traditional.
