= Municipalities of Jalisco =

List of municipalities of Mexican state

Map of Mexico with Jalisco highlighted

Jalisco is a state in western Mexico that is divided into 125 municipalities. According to the 2020 INEGI census, it is the third most populated state with 8,348,151 inhabitants and the seventh largest by land area spanning 78,595.9 square kilometres (30,346.0 sq mi). The largest municipality by population is Zapopan, with 1,476,491 residents (17.68% of the state's total), while the smallest is Santa María del Oro with 1,815 residents. The largest municipality by land area is Mezquitic which spans 3,363.60 km^{2} (1,298.69 sq mi), and the smallest is Techaluta with 79.20 km^{2} (30.58 sq mi). The newest is San Ignacio Cerro Gordo, established in 2007 out of Arandas.

Municipalities in Jalisco are administratively autonomous of the state according to the 115th article of the 1917 Constitution of Mexico. Their legal framework derives from the state Constitution. Every three years, citizens elect a municipal president (Spanish: presidente municipal) by a plurality voting system who heads a concurrently elected municipal council (ayuntamiento) responsible for providing all the public services for their constituents. The municipal council consists of a variable number of trustees and councillors (regidores y síndicos). Municipalities are responsible for public services (such as water and sewerage), street lighting, public safety, traffic, and the maintenance of public parks, gardens and cemeteries. They may also assist the state and federal governments in education, emergency fire and medical services, environmental protection and maintenance of monuments and historical landmarks. Since 1984, they have had the power to collect property taxes and user fees, although more funds are obtained from the state and federal governments than from their own income.

== Municipalities ==
Largest municipalities in Jalisco by population

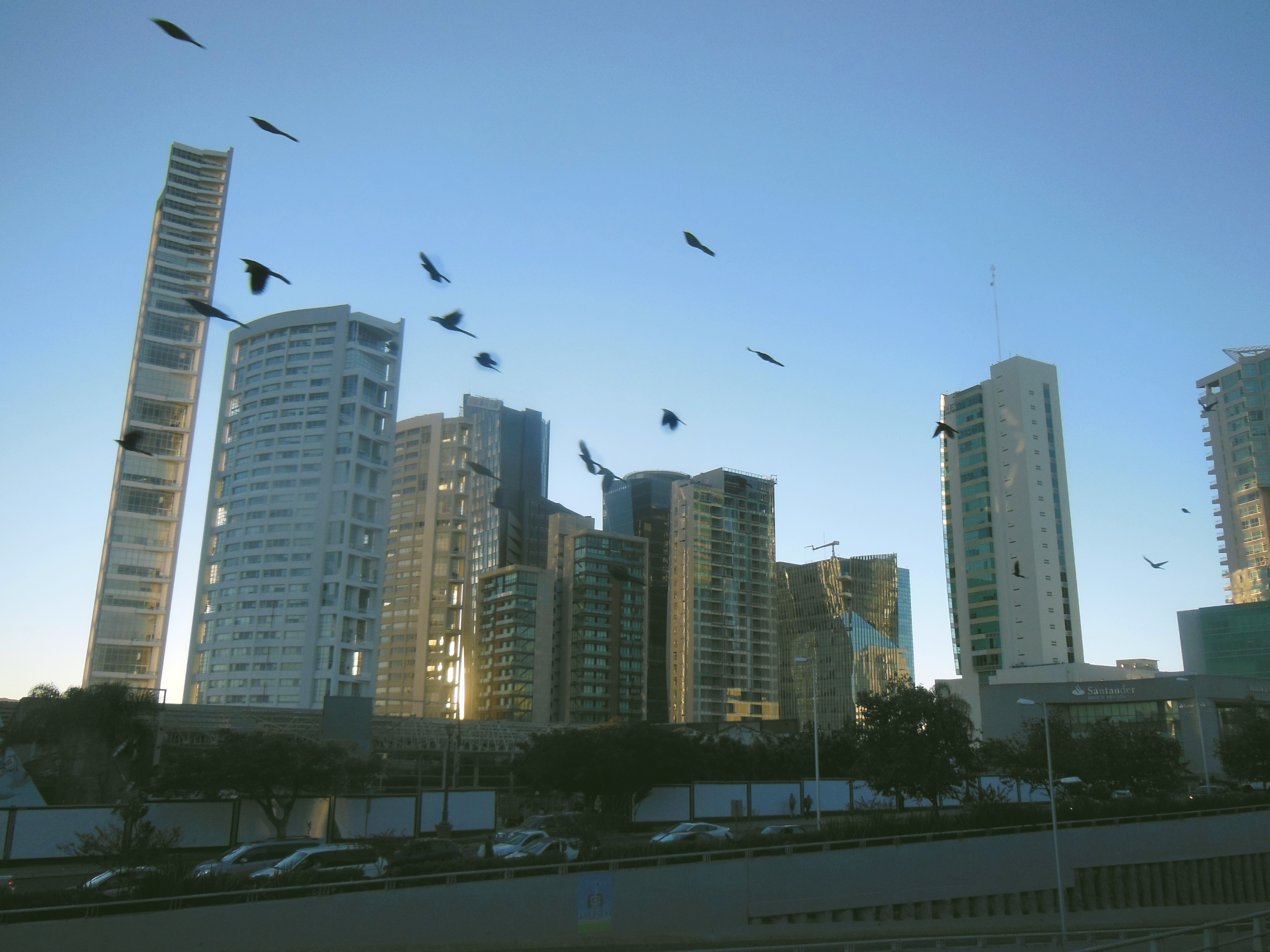
Zapopan is part of the Guadalajara Metropolitan Area and the largest municipality by population in Jalisco.

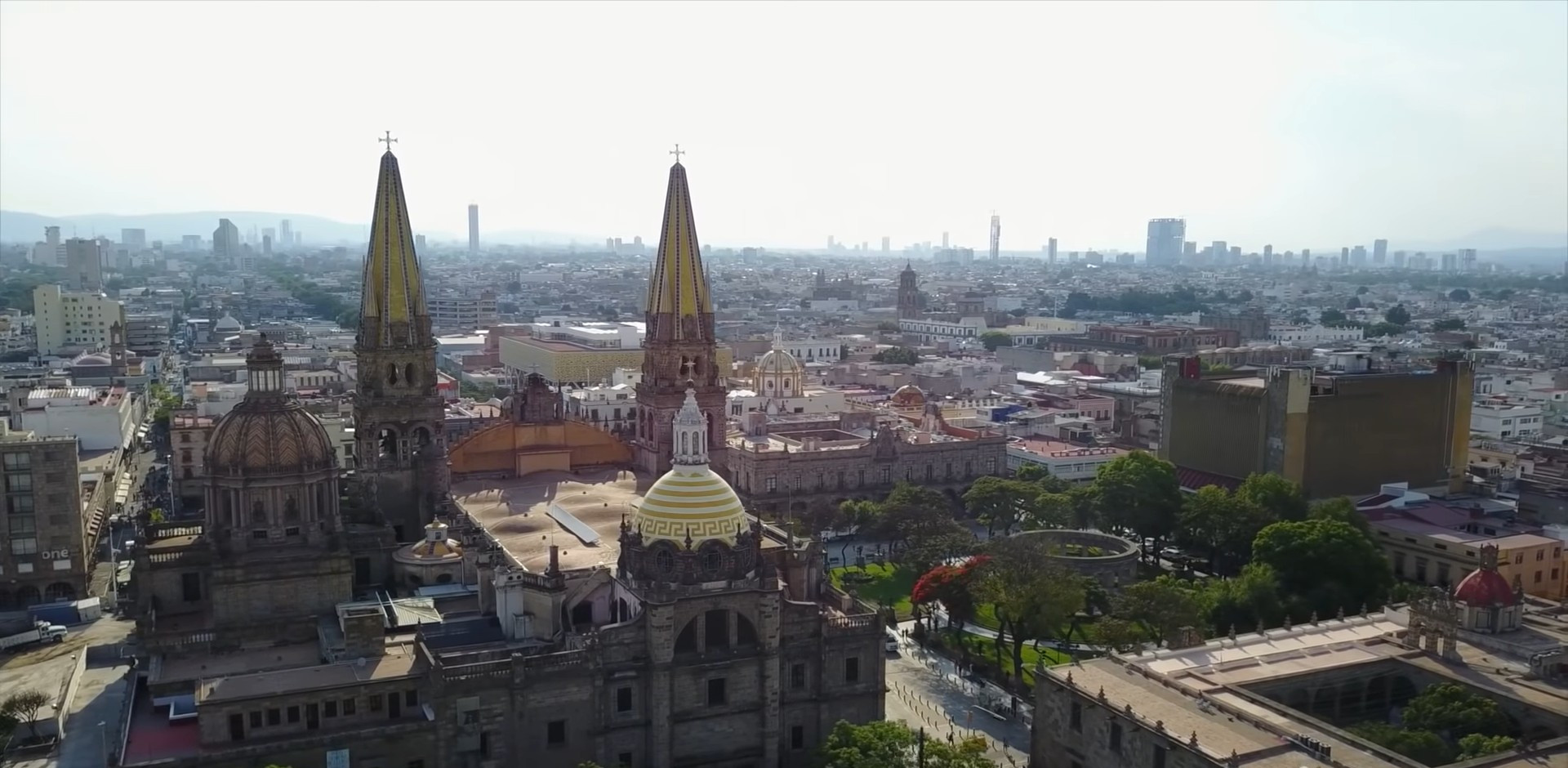
Guadalajara, capital and second largest municipality by population

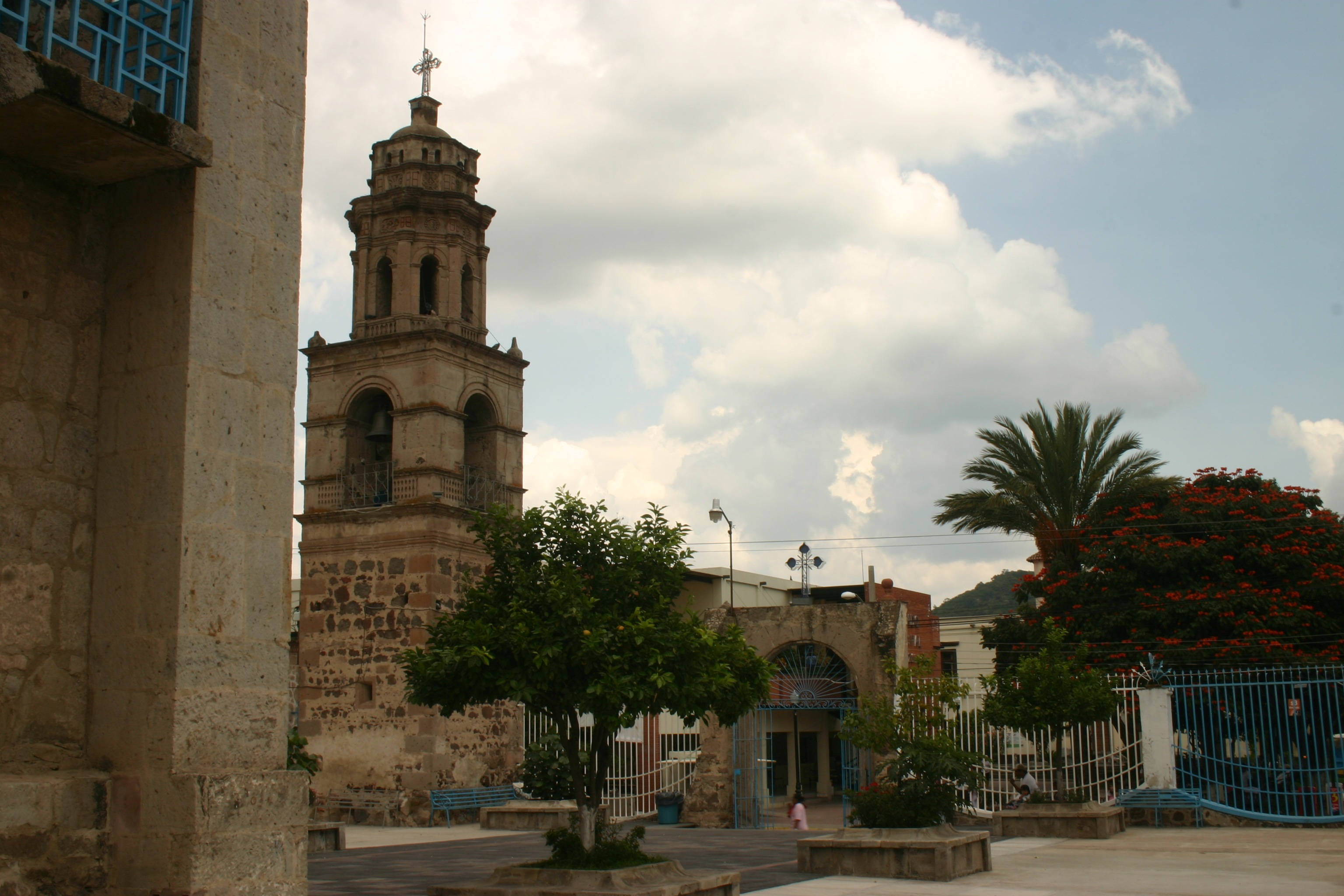
Tlajomulco, third largest municipality by population

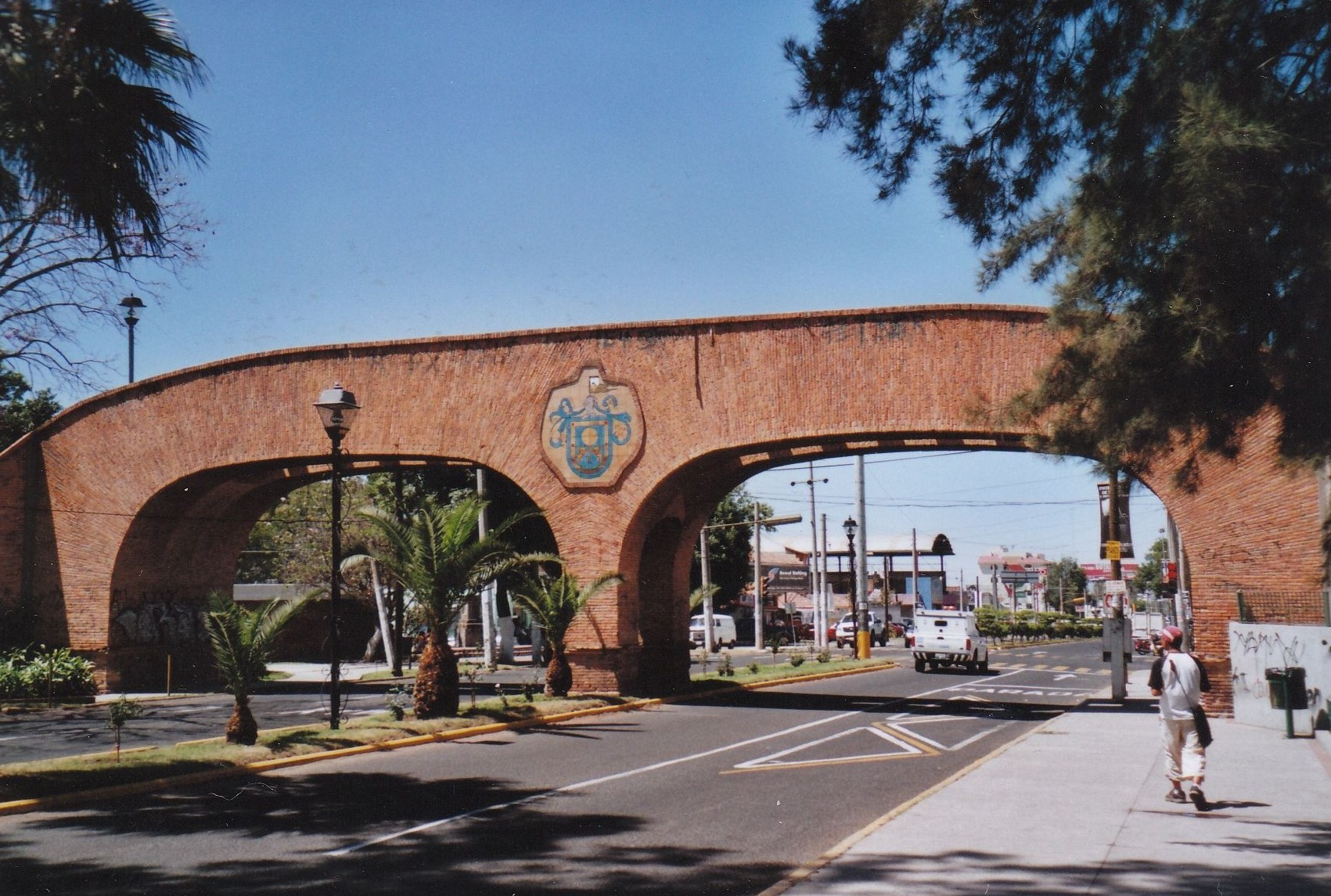
Tlaquepaque, fourth largest municipality by population

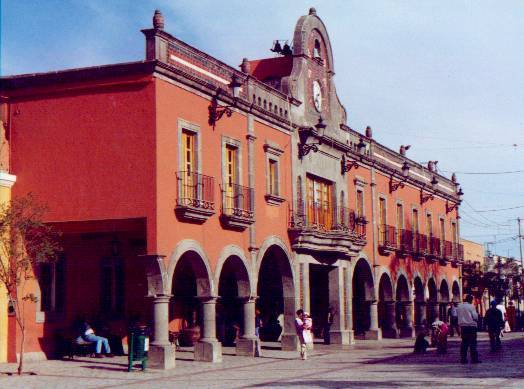
Tonalá, fifth largest municipality by population

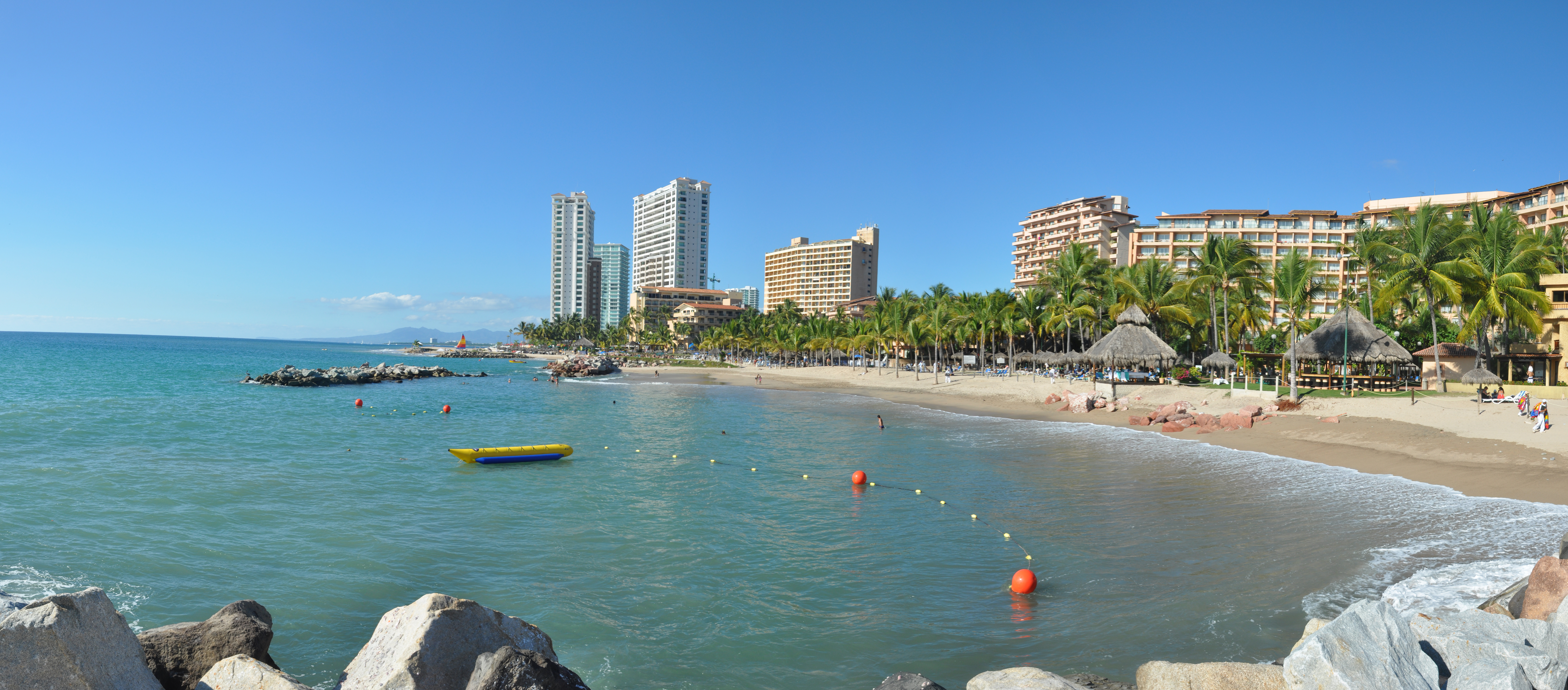
Puerto Vallarta, sixth largest municipality by population

† State capital

Municipalities of Jalisco
Name	Municipal seat	Population (2020)	Population (2010)	Change	Land area		Population density (2020)	Incorporation date
Name	Municipal seat	Population (2020)	Population (2010)	Change	km^{2}	sq mi	Population density (2020)	Incorporation date
Acatic	Acatic	23,175	21,206	+9.3%	339.2	131.0	68.3/km^{2} (177.0/sq mi)	August 15, 1823
Acatlán	Acatlán de Juárez	25,250	23,241	+8.6%	160.7	62.0	157.1/km^{2} (407.0/sq mi)	August 15, 1823
Ahualulco	Ahualulco de Mercado	23,630	21,714	+8.8%	274.0	105.8	86.2/km^{2} (223.4/sq mi)	August 15, 1823
Amacueca	Amacueca	5,743	5,545	+3.6%	124.8	48.2	46.0/km^{2} (119.2/sq mi)	August 15, 1823
Amatitán	Amatitán	16,490	14,648	+12.6%	172.6	66.6	95.5/km^{2} (247.4/sq mi)	August 15, 1823
Ameca	Ameca	60,386	57,340	+5.3%	839.1	324.0	72.0/km^{2} (186.4/sq mi)	August 15, 1823
Arandas	Arandas	80,609	72,812	+10.7%	949.8	366.7	84.9/km^{2} (219.8/sq mi)	August 15, 1823
Atemajac de Brizuela	Atemajac de Brizuela	7,758	6,655	+16.6%	355.8	137.4	21.8/km^{2} (56.5/sq mi)	August 15, 1823
Atengo	Atengo	5,599	5,400	+3.7%	440.6	170.1	17.6/km^{2} (45.6/sq mi)	June 5, 1918
Atenguillo	Atenguillo	4,176	4,115	+1.5%	610.2	235.6	6.8/km^{2} (17.7/sq mi)	March 20, 1885
Atotonilco El Alto	Atotonilco El Alto	64,009	57,717	+10.9%	510.9	197.3	125.3/km^{2} (324.5/sq mi)	August 15, 1823
Atoyac	Atoyac	8,689	8,276	+5.0%	451.5	174.3	19.2/km^{2} (49.8/sq mi)	August 15, 1823
Autlán	Autlán de Navarro	64,931	57,559	+12.8%	705.1	272.2	92.1/km^{2} (238.5/sq mi)	June 21, 1823
Ayotlán (Note: Ayotlán was originally incorporated as Ayo el Chico, changing its name on January 17, 1981.)	Ayotlán	41,552	38,291	+8.5%	430.9	166.4	96.4/km^{2} (249.8/sq mi)	August 15, 1823
Ayutla	Ayutla	12,880	12,664	+1.7%	883.4	341.1	14.6/km^{2} (37.8/sq mi)	August 15, 1823
Bolaños (Note: Bolaños was merged with Totatiche from 1872 to 1885.)	Bolaños	7,043	6,820	+3.3%	866.5	334.6	8.1/km^{2} (21.1/sq mi)	August 15, 1823
Cabo Corrientes (Note: Cabo Corrientes was originally incorporated as El Tuito, changing its name on March 18, 1944.)	El Tuito	10,940	10,029	+9.1%	1,543.4	595.9	7.1/km^{2} (18.4/sq mi)	November 14, 1824
Cañadas (Note: Cañadas renamed Villa Obregón from 1929 to 1971.)	Cañadas de Obregón	4,388	4,152	+5.7%	271.8	104.9	40.3/km^{2} (104.2/sq mi)	August 15, 1823
Casimiro Castillo	Casimiro Castillo	20,548	21,475	−4.3%	522.7	201.8	39.3/km^{2} (101.8/sq mi)	December 11, 1943
Chapala (Note: Chapala was merged with Guadalajara from 1931 to 1939.)	Chapala	55,196	48,839	+13.0%	630.0	243.2	87.6/km^{2} (226.9/sq mi)	August 15, 1823
Chimaltitán (Note: Chimaltitán was merged with Bolaños from 1943 to 1944.)	Chimaltitán	3,270	3,771	−13.3%	655.1	252.9	5.0/km^{2} (12.9/sq mi)	August 15, 1823
Chiquilistlán	Chiquilistlán	5,983	5,814	+2.9%	297.4	114.8	20.1/km^{2} (52.1/sq mi)	August 15, 1823
Cihuatlán	Cihuatlán	40,139	39,020	+2.9%	501.3	193.6	80.1/km^{2} (207.4/sq mi)	September 12, 1904
Cocula	Cocula	29,267	26,174	+11.8%	331.2	127.9	88.4/km^{2} (228.9/sq mi)	August 15, 1823
Colotlán	Colotlán	19,689	18,091	+8.8%	648.1	250.2	30.4/km^{2} (78.7/sq mi)	June 21, 1823
Concepción de Buenos Aires	Concepción de Buenos Aires	6,334	5,933	+6.8%	265.6	102.5	23.8/km^{2} (61.8/sq mi)	March 10, 1888
Cuautitlán	Cuautitlán de García Barragán	18,370	17,322	+6.1%	1,391.1	537.1	13.2/km^{2} (34.2/sq mi)	August 15, 1823
Cuautla	Cuautla	2,166	2,171	−0.2%	417.1	161.0	5.2/km^{2} (13.4/sq mi)	February 29, 1888
Cuquío	Cuquío	17,820	17,795	+0.1%	643.0	248.3	27.7/km^{2} (71.8/sq mi)	June 21, 1823
Degollado	Degollado	21,226	21,132	+0.4%	426.7	164.7	49.7/km^{2} (128.8/sq mi)	December 31, 1861
Ejutla	Ejutla	1,981	2,082	−4.9%	297.6	114.9	6.7/km^{2} (17.2/sq mi)	August 15, 1823
El Arenal	El Arenal	21,115	17,545	+20.3%	111.8	43.2	188.9/km^{2} (489.2/sq mi)	June 5, 1923
El Grullo	El Grullo	25,920	23,845	+8.7%	177.3	68.5	146.2/km^{2} (378.6/sq mi)	December 14, 1912
El Limón	El Limón	5,368	5,499	−2.4%	114.2	44.1	47.0/km^{2} (121.7/sq mi)	June 8, 1921
El Salto	El Salto	232,852	138,226	+68.5%	92.8	35.8	2,509.2/km^{2} (6,498.7/sq mi)	December 25, 1943
Encarnación	Encarnación de Díaz	53,039	51,396	+3.2%	1,253.4	483.9	42.3/km^{2} (109.6/sq mi)	August 15, 1823
Etzatlán	Etzatlán	20,011	18,632	+7.4%	337.8	130.4	59.2/km^{2} (153.4/sq mi)	June 21, 1823
Gómez Farías (Note: Gómez Farías was originally incorporated as San Sebastián, changing its name on November 10, 1939.)	San Sebastián del Sur	16,431	14,011	+17.3%	353.4	136.4	46.5/km^{2} (120.4/sq mi)	May 1, 1886
Guachinango	Guachinango	4,199	4,323	−2.9%	837.7	323.4	5.0/km^{2} (13.0/sq mi)	August 15, 1823
Guadalajara†	Guadalajara	1,385,629	1,495,189	−7.3%	151.0	58.3	9,176.4/km^{2} (23,766.6/sq mi)	June 21, 1823
Hostotipaquillo	Hostotipaquillo	8,732	10,284	−15.1%	756.4	292.0	11.5/km^{2} (29.9/sq mi)	June 21, 1823
Huejúcar	Huejúcar	5,920	6,084	−2.7%	309.2	119.4	19.1/km^{2} (49.6/sq mi)	November 11, 1861
Huejuquilla El Alto	Huejuquilla El Alto	10,015	8,781	+14.1%	769.5	297.1	13.0/km^{2} (33.7/sq mi)	January 26, 1814
Ixtlahuacán de los Membrillos	Ixtlahuacán de los Membrillos	67,969	41,060	+65.5%	201.2	77.7	337.8/km^{2} (874.9/sq mi)	May 1, 1886
Ixtlahuacan del Río (Note: Ixtlahuacan del Río was originally incorporated as Yztlahuacan, changing its name on May 1, 1886.)	Ixtlahuacan del Río	20,465	19,005	+7.7%	831.8	321.2	24.6/km^{2} (63.7/sq mi)	August 15, 1823
Jalostotitlán	Jalostotitlán	32,678	31,948	+2.3%	520.9	201.1	62.7/km^{2} (162.5/sq mi)	August 15, 1823
Jamay (Note: Jamay was split between La Barca and Ocotlán from 1837 to 1914.)	Jamay	24,894	22,881	+8.8%	162.8	62.9	152.9/km^{2} (396.0/sq mi)	August 15, 1823
Jesús María	Jesús María	18,982	18,634	+1.9%	665.2	256.8	28.5/km^{2} (73.9/sq mi)	July 9, 1875
Jilotlán de los Dolores	Jilotlán de los Dolores	9,425	9,545	−1.3%	1,476.2	570.0	6.4/km^{2} (16.5/sq mi)	October 28, 1870
Jocotepec	Jocotepec	47,105	42,164	+11.7%	324.3	125.2	145.3/km^{2} (376.2/sq mi)	March 13, 1832
Juanacatlán	Juanacatlán	30,855	13,218	+133.4%	138.1	53.3	223.4/km^{2} (578.7/sq mi)	December 20, 1898
Juchitlán	Juchitlán	5,534	5,515	+0.3%	245.9	94.9	22.5/km^{2} (58.3/sq mi)	May 1, 1886
La Barca	La Barca	67,937	64,269	+5.7%	418.2	161.5	162.5/km^{2} (420.7/sq mi)	June 21, 1823
La Huerta	La Huerta	23,258	23,428	−0.7%	2,009.5	775.9	11.6/km^{2} (30.0/sq mi)	November 14, 1946
La Manzanilla de La Paz	La Manzanilla de La Paz	4,099	3,755	+9.2%	134.0	51.7	30.6/km^{2} (79.2/sq mi)	January 1, 1910
Lagos de Moreno	Lagos de Moreno	172,403	153,817	+12.1%	2,514.4	970.8	68.6/km^{2} (177.6/sq mi)	June 21, 1823
Magdalena	Magdalena	21,781	21,321	+2.2%	293.2	113.2	74.3/km^{2} (192.4/sq mi)	August 15, 1823
Mascota	Mascota	14,451	14,245	+1.4%	1,843.1	711.6	7.8/km^{2} (20.3/sq mi)	June 21, 1823
Mazamitla	Mazamitla	14,043	13,225	+6.2%	288.9	111.5	48.6/km^{2} (125.9/sq mi)	June 21, 1823
Mexticacán	Mexticacán	5,307	6,034	−12.0%	287.0	110.8	18.5/km^{2} (47.9/sq mi)	June 21, 1823
Mezquitic	Mezquitic	22,083	18,084	+22.1%	3,363.6	1,298.7	6.6/km^{2} (17.0/sq mi)	May 3, 1872
Mixtlán	Mixtlán	3,638	3,574	+1.8%	631.0	243.6	5.8/km^{2} (14.9/sq mi)	October 20, 1938
Ocotlán	Ocotlán	106,050	92,967	+14.1%	242.7	93.7	437.0/km^{2} (1,131.7/sq mi)	August 15, 1823
Ojuelos	Ojuelos de Jalisco	33,588	30,097	+11.6%	1,155.7	446.2	29.1/km^{2} (75.3/sq mi)	September 22, 1874
Píhuamo	Píhuamo	11,386	12,119	−6.0%	874.6	337.7	13.0/km^{2} (33.7/sq mi)	August 15, 1823
Poncitlán	Poncitlán	53,659	48,408	+10.8%	834.9	322.4	64.3/km^{2} (166.5/sq mi)	August 15, 1823
Puerto Vallarta	Puerto Vallarta	291,839	255,681	+14.1%	680.8	262.9	428.7/km^{2} (1,110.3/sq mi)	June 5, 1918
Quitupan	Quitupan	7,734	8,691	−11.0%	674.3	260.3	11.5/km^{2} (29.7/sq mi)	August 15, 1823
San Cristóbal de la Barranca	San Cristóbal de la Barranca	2,924	3,176	−7.9%	523.0	201.9	5.6/km^{2} (14.5/sq mi)	August 15, 1823
San Diego de Alejandría	San Diego de Alejandría	7,609	6,647	+14.5%	351.7	135.8	21.6/km^{2} (56.0/sq mi)	February 28, 1885
San Gabriel (Note: San Gabriel was renamed Venustiano Carranza between 1934 and 1993.)	San Gabriel	16,548	15,310	+8.1%	746.1	288.1	22.2/km^{2} (57.4/sq mi)	August 15, 1823
San Ignacio Cerro Gordo	San Ignacio Cerro Gordo	18,341	17,626	+4.1%	227.8	88.0	80.5/km^{2} (208.5/sq mi)	January 1, 2007
San Juan de los Lagos	San Juan de los Lagos	72,230	65,219	+10.7%	847.7	327.3	85.2/km^{2} (220.7/sq mi)	August 15, 1823
San Juanito de Escobedo (Note: San Juanito was originally incorporated as Antonio Escobedo, changing its name on December 23, 1997.)	San Juanito de Escobedo	9,433	8,896	+6.0%	194.7	75.2	371.0/km^{2} (960.8/sq mi)	February 7, 1939
San Julián	San Julián	16,792	15,454	+8.7%	261.9	101.1	64.1/km^{2} (166.1/sq mi)	November 8, 1912
San Marcos	San Marcos	3,791	3,762	+0.8%	305.5	118.0	12.4/km^{2} (32.1/sq mi)	January 1, 1908
San Martín de Bolaños	San Martín de Bolaños	3,095	3,405	−9.1%	690.1	266.4	4.5/km^{2} (11.6/sq mi)	September 7, 1872
San Martín Hidalgo (Note: San Martín Hidalgo was originally incorporated as San Martín de la Cal, changing its name on December 12, 1883.)	San Martín Hidalgo	28,102	26,306	+6.8%	342.9	132.4	82.0/km^{2} (212.3/sq mi)	August 15, 1823
San Miguel El Alto	San Miguel El Alto	31,965	31,166	+2.6%	787.0	303.9	40.6/km^{2} (105.2/sq mi)	August 15, 1823
San Sebastián del Oeste (Note: San Sebastián del Oeste was originally incorporated as Real de San Sebastián, changing its name to San Sebastián in 1886 and to its current name on October 22, 1983.)	San Sebastián del Oeste	5,086	5,755	−11.6%	1,116.7	431.2	4.6/km^{2} (11.8/sq mi)	June 21, 1823
Santa María de los Ángeles	Santa María de los Ángeles	3,515	3,726	−5.7%	260.8	100.7	13.5/km^{2} (34.9/sq mi)	February 17, 1875
Santa María del Oro (Note: Santa María del Oro was originally incorporated as Manuel M. Diéguez, changing its name on April 10, 1999.)	Santa María del Oro	1,815	2,517	−27.9%	776.4	299.8	2.3/km^{2} (6.1/sq mi)	January 5, 1939
Sayula	Sayula	37,186	34,829	+6.8%	216.0	83.4	172.2/km^{2} (445.9/sq mi)	June 21, 1823
Tala	Tala	87,690	69,031	+27.0%	451.8	174.4	194.1/km^{2} (502.7/sq mi)	June 21, 1823
Talpa	Talpa de Allende	14,997	14,410	+4.1%	1,996.4	770.8	7.5/km^{2} (19.5/sq mi)	August 15, 1823
Tamazula	Tamazula de Gordiano	38,955	37,986	+2.6%	1,363.7	526.5	28.6/km^{2} (74.0/sq mi)	August 15, 1823
Tapalpa	Tapalpa	21,245	18,096	+17.4%	619.4	239.2	34.3/km^{2} (88.8/sq mi)	August 15, 1823
Tecalitlán	Tecalitlán	16,705	16,847	−0.8%	1,301.0	502.3	12.8/km^{2} (33.3/sq mi)	October 28, 1870
Techaluta (Note: Techaluta was merged into Zacoalco from 1824 to 1888.)	Techaluta de Montenegro	4,072	3,511	+16.0%	79.2	30.6	51.4/km^{2} (133.2/sq mi)	August 15, 1823
Tecolotlán	Tecolotlán	16,603	16,573	+0.2%	765.1	295.4	21.7/km^{2} (56.2/sq mi)	August 15, 1823
Tenamaxtlán	Tenamaxtlán	7,302	7,051	+3.6%	281.5	108.7	25.9/km^{2} (67.2/sq mi)	August 15, 1823
Teocaltiche	Teocaltiche	39,839	40,105	−0.7%	933.5	360.4	42.7/km^{2} (110.5/sq mi)	August 15, 1823
Teocuitatlán	Teocuitatlán de Corona	11,039	10,837	+1.9%	334.4	129.1	33.0/km^{2} (85.5/sq mi)	August 15, 1823
Tepatitlán	Tepatitlán de Morelos	150,190	136,123	+10.3%	1,400.1	540.6	107.3/km^{2} (277.8/sq mi)	June 21, 1823
Tequila	Tequila	44,353	40,697	+9.0%	1,693.0	653.7	26.2/km^{2} (67.9/sq mi)	June 21, 1823
Teuchitlán	Teuchitlán	9,647	9,088	+6.2%	219.1	84.6	44.0/km^{2} (114.0/sq mi)	August 15, 1823
Tizapan El Alto	Tizapan El Alto	22,758	20,857	+9.1%	193.9	74.9	117.4/km^{2} (304.0/sq mi)	August 15, 1823
Tlajomulco	Tlajomulco de Zuñiga	727,750	416,626	+74.7%	671.4	259.2	1,083.9/km^{2} (2,807.4/sq mi)	June 21, 1823
Tlaquepaque (Note: Tlaquepaque was originally incorporated as San Pedro, changing its name on December 29, 1910.)	San Pedro Tlaquepaque	687,127	608,114	+13.0%	116.8	45.1	5,882.9/km^{2} (15,236.7/sq mi)	March 27, 1824
Tolimán	Tolimán	11,219	9,591	+17.0%	512.6	197.9	21.9/km^{2} (56.7/sq mi)	August 15, 1823
Tomatlán	Tomatlán	36,316	35,050	+3.6%	3,014.8	1,164.0	12.0/km^{2} (31.2/sq mi)	June 21, 1823
Tonalá	Tonalá	569,913	478,689	+19.1%	158.0	61.0	3,607.0/km^{2} (9,342.2/sq mi)	June 21, 1823
Tonaya	Tonaya	5,961	5,930	+0.5%	293.6	113.4	20.3/km^{2} (52.6/sq mi)	August 15, 1823
Tonila	Tonila	7,565	7,256	+4.3%	145.9	56.3	51.9/km^{2} (134.3/sq mi)	August 15, 1823
Totatiche	Totatiche	4,180	4,435	−5.7%	587.0	226.6	7.1/km^{2} (18.4/sq mi)	August 15, 1823
Tototlán	Tototlán	23,573	21,871	+7.8%	336.6	130.0	70.0/km^{2} (181.4/sq mi)	August 15, 1823
Tuxcacuesco	Tuxcacuesco	5,482	4,234	+29.5%	430.0	166.0	12.7/km^{2} (33.0/sq mi)	June 21, 1823
Tuxcueca	Tuxcueca	6,702	6,316	+6.1%	132.4	51.1	50.6/km^{2} (131.1/sq mi)	April 20, 1886
Tuxpan	Tuxpan	37,518	34,182	+9.8%	725.5	280.1	51.7/km^{2} (133.9/sq mi)	August 15, 1823
Unión de San Antonio (Note: Unión de San Antonio was originally incorporated as San Antonio Adobes, changing its name on May 1, 1886.)	Unión de San Antonio	19,069	17,325	+10.1%	728.8	281.4	26.2/km^{2} (67.8/sq mi)	August 15, 1823
Unión de Tula	Unión de Tula	13,799	13,737	+0.5%	443.0	171.0	31.1/km^{2} (80.7/sq mi)	September 21, 1832
Valle de Guadalupe	Valle de Guadalupe	6,627	6,705	−1.2%	352.3	136.0	18.8/km^{2} (48.7/sq mi)	June 7, 1922
Valle de Juárez (Note: Valle de Juárez was originally incorporated as Valle de Mazamitla, changing its name on March 1, 1911.)	Valle de Juárez	6,151	5,798	+6.1%	195.2	75.4	31.5/km^{2} (81.6/sq mi)	June 7, 1922
Villa Corona (Note: Villa Corona was originally incorporated as Tizapanito, changing its name on June 5, 1918.)	Villa Corona	19,063	16,969	+12.3%	318.2	122.9	59.9/km^{2} (155.2/sq mi)	August 15, 1823
Villa Guerrero (Note: Villa Guerrero was originally incorporated as El Salitre, changing its name on May 28, 1921.)	Villa Guerrero	5,525	5,638	−2.0%	673.3	260.0	8.2/km^{2} (21.3/sq mi)	April 30, 1921
Villa Hidalgo (Note: Villa Hidalgo was originally incorporated as Paso de Sotos, changing its name on June 3, 1922.)	Villa Hidalgo	20,088	18,711	+7.4%	452.9	174.9	44.4/km^{2} (114.9/sq mi)	August 15, 1823
Villa Purificación (Note: Villa Purificación was merged with Autlán from 1883 to 1888.)	Villa Purificación	11,303	11,623	−2.8%	1,848.1	713.6	6.1/km^{2} (15.8/sq mi)	August 15, 1823
Yahualica	Yahualica de González Gallo	22,394	22,284	+0.5%	563.3	217.5	39.8/km^{2} (103.0/sq mi)	August 15, 1823
Zacoalco	Zacoalco de Torres	30,472	27,901	+9.2%	472.4	182.4	64.5/km^{2} (167.1/sq mi)	August 15, 1823
Zapopan	Zapopan	1,476,491	1,243,756	+18.7%	1,158.7	447.4	1,274.3/km^{2} (3,300.3/sq mi)	June 21, 1823
Zapotiltic	Zapotiltic	33,713	29,192	+15.5%	252.3	97.4	133.6/km^{2} (346.1/sq mi)	March 4, 1831
Zapotitlán	Zapotitlán de Vadillo	7,466	6,685	+11.7%	305.8	118.1	24.4/km^{2} (63.2/sq mi)	May 1, 1886
Zapotlán del Rey	Zapotlán del Rey	19,279	17,585	+9.6%	399.9	154.4	48.2/km^{2} (124.9/sq mi)	January 13, 1913
Zapotlán el Grande (Note: Zapotlán el Grande was renamed Ciudad Guzmán from 1856 to 1997.)	Ciudad Guzmán	115,141	100,534	+14.5%	273.5	105.6	421.0/km^{2} (1,090.4/sq mi)	June 23, 1824
Zapotlanejo	Zapotlanejo	64,806	63,636	+1.8%	718.8	277.5	90.2/km^{2} (233.5/sq mi)	March 27, 1824
Jalisco	—	8,348,151	7,350,682	+13.6%	78,595.9	30,346.0	106.2/km^{2} (275.1/sq mi)	—
Mexico	—	126,014,024	112,336,538	+12.2%	1,960,646.7	757,010	64.3/km^{2} (166.5/sq mi)	—
