= Casimiro Castillo =

- Municipality
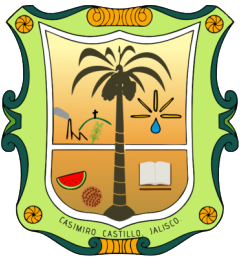
- Coat of arms

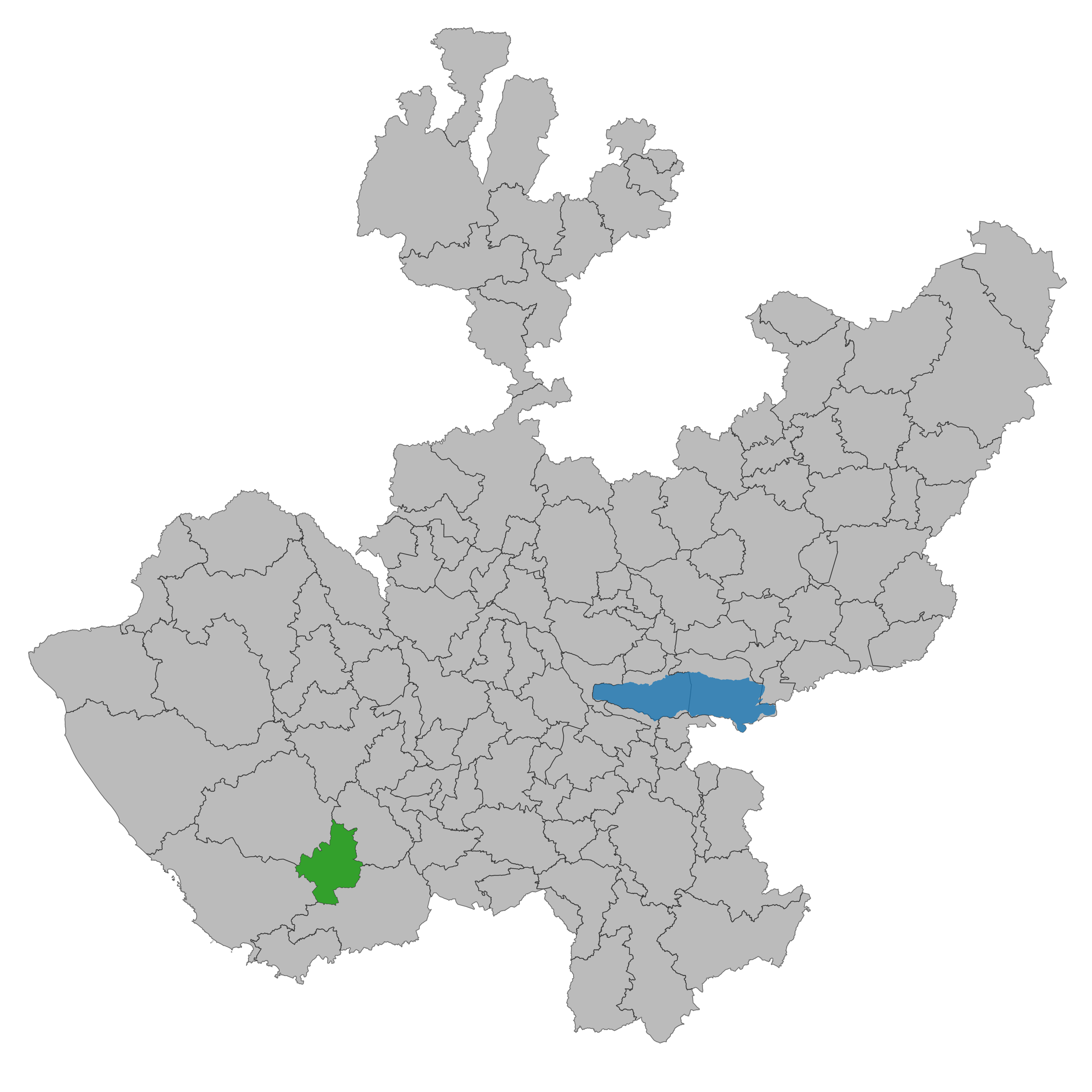
- Location of the municipality in Jalisco

- Location in Mexico
- Coordinates: 19°20′33″N 104°17′16″W
- Country: Mexico
- State: Jalisco

Area
  - Total: 522.7 km^{2} (201.8 sq mi)

Population (2020 census)
  - Total: 20,548
  - Density: 39.31/km^{2} (101.8/sq mi)

Casimiro Castillo is a municipality, in Jalisco in central-western Mexico. The municipality covers an area of 522.7 km^{2}.

As of 2005, the municipality had a total population of 18,913.

Five police officers from Casimiro Castillo were arrested for the murder of a young man on August 26, 2020. The body of Alfredo Sevilla, mayor on leave, was found at the bottom of a gully on March 10, 2021.

As of March 11, 2021, the municipality reported 118 cases and 31 deaths related to the COVID-19 pandemic in Mexico.

== Localities ==
Name	Population (2020 census)
La Resolana	11,543
Lo Arado	3,140
Tecomates	1,394
Piedra Pesada	1,110
El Zapotillo	872
El Chico	787
Coyamel	429
Francisco I. Madero	284
