= Teocuitatlán de Corona =

- Municipality and town
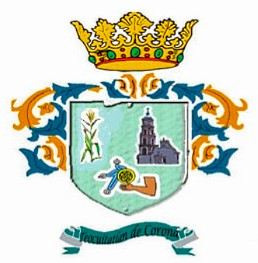
- Coat of arms

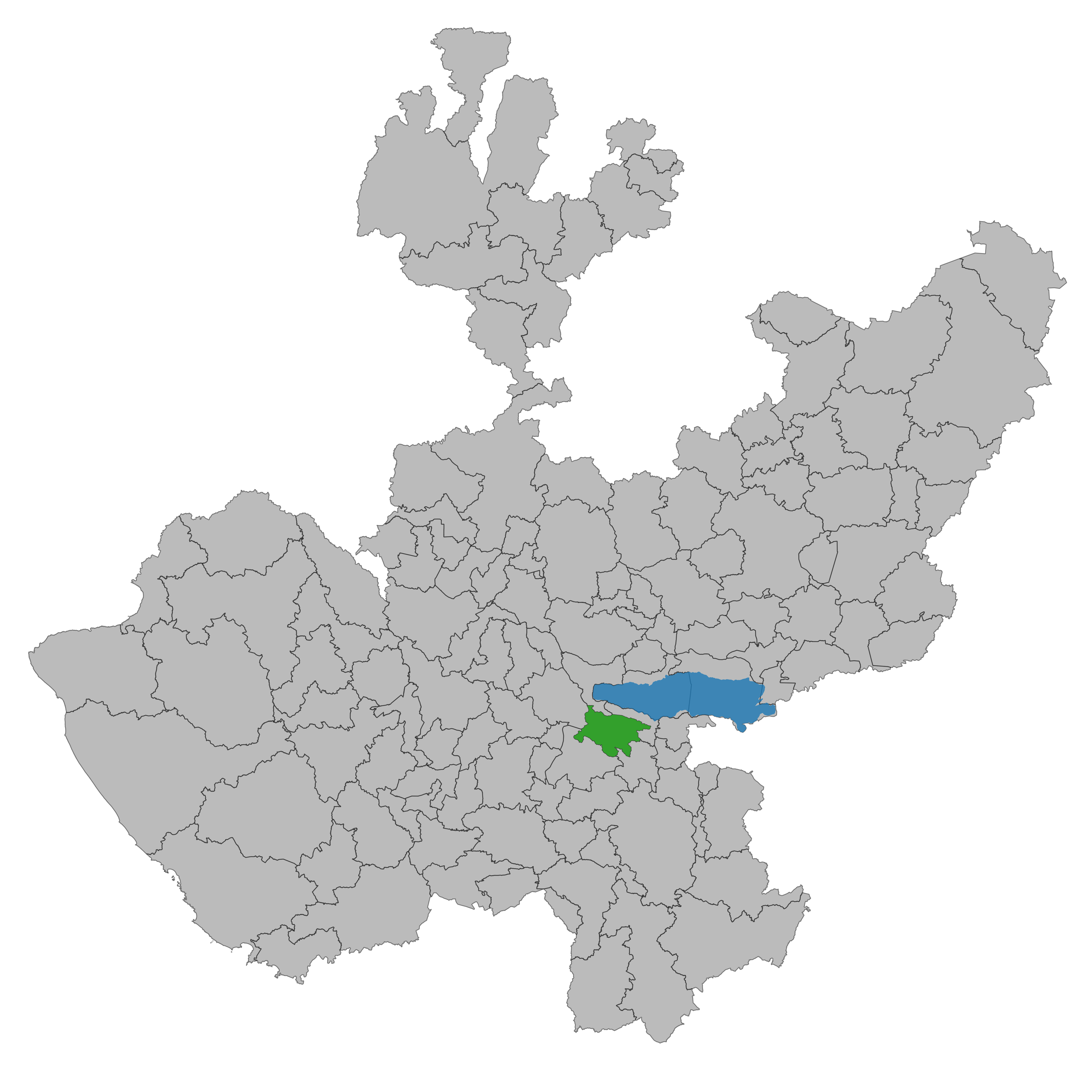
- Location of the municipality in Jalisco

- Location in Mexico
- Coordinates: 20°01′N 103°11′W
- Country: Mexico
- State: Jalisco

Area
  - Total: 334.4 km^{2} (129.1 sq mi)
  - Town: 2.05 km^{2} (0.79 sq mi)

Population (2020 census)
  - Total: 11,039
  - Density: 33.01/km^{2} (85.50/sq mi)
  - Town: 3,986
  - Town density: 1,940/km^{2} (5,040/sq mi)
- Time zone: UTC-6 (Central Standard Time)

Teocuitatlán de Corona is a town and municipality, in Jalisco in central-western Mexico. The municipality covers an area of 334.4 km^{2}.

In 2005, the municipality had a total population of 10,226.
