= Villa Corona =

- Municipality and town
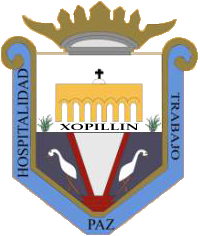
- Coat of arms

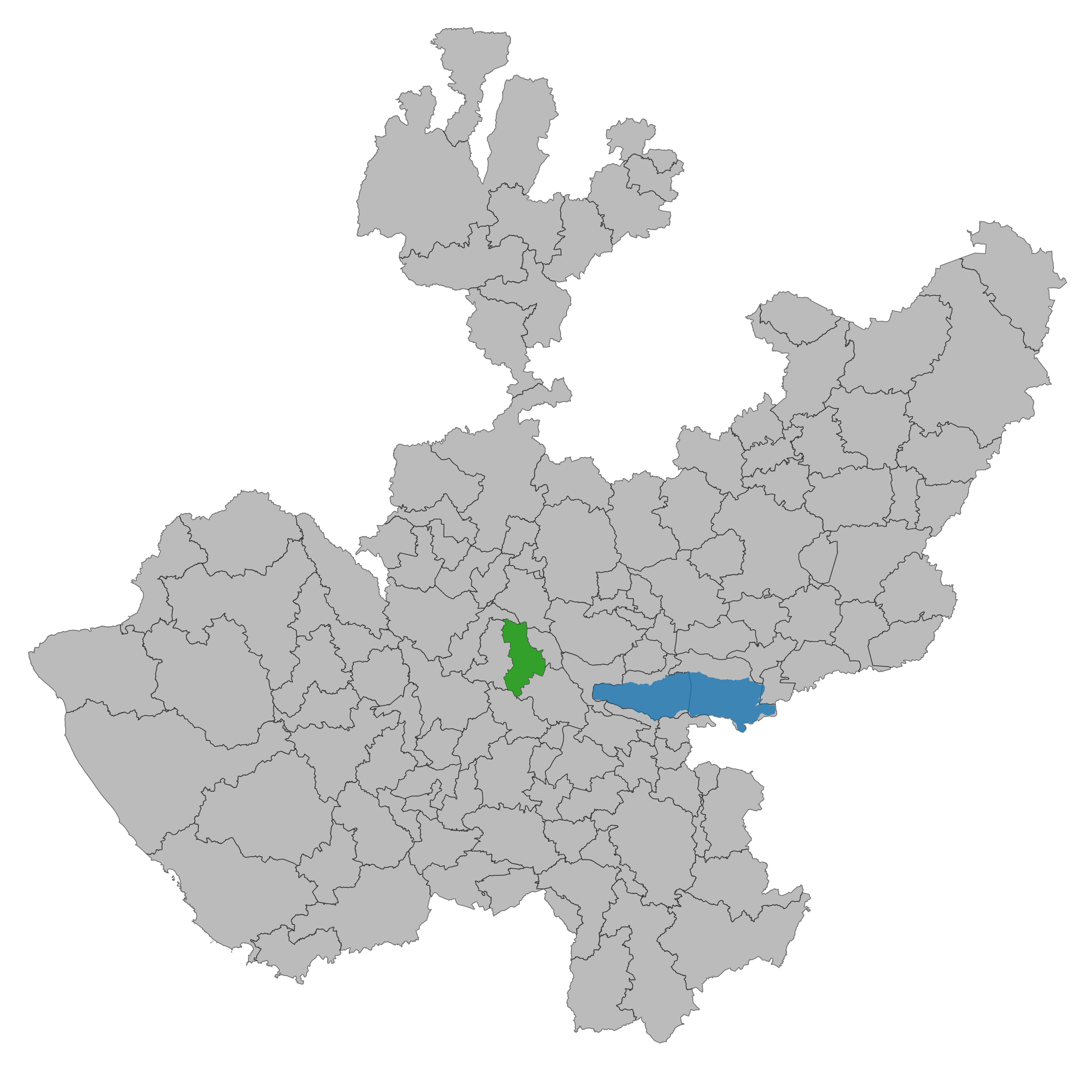
- Location of the municipality in Jalisco

- Location in Mexico
- Coordinates: 20°14′30″N 103°37′0″W
- Country: Mexico
- State: Jalisco

Area
  - Total: 318.2 km^{2} (122.9 sq mi)
  - Town: 3.1 km^{2} (1.2 sq mi)

Population (2020 census)
  - Total: 19,063
  - Density: 59.91/km^{2} (155.2/sq mi)
  - Town: 8,485
  - Town density: 2,700/km^{2} (7,100/sq mi)
- Time zone: UTC-6 (Central Standard Time)

Villa Corona is a town and municipality, in Jalisco in central-western Mexico. The municipality covers an area of 318.2 km^{2}.

In 1160, several families left Aztlán, forming two large migrant groups. One group went to the north of what is now Jalisco, and the other group towards the Pacific region. The group that migrated towards Jalisco arrived at what is now Villa Corona in approximately 1250. One of the tribes decided to stay for their love of hunting and fishing. They were promptly accepted by the locals, all thanks to their peaceful and pacifist ways. It is likely that during these days the name Tizapanito (initially Tizapantzinco) was conceived, a name which means place on the white land.

Decree No. 242 of September 1871 stated that the political police station, Tizapanito, split from the municipality of Ameca and was added to the town of Cocula. On May 31, 1918, Decree No. 1899, issued on June 5, and in the first article, erected the municipality with the name of Villa Corona. Agapito Aguayo was approved as its first mayor.
