= Atemajac de Brizuela =

Brizuela
- Municipality and town
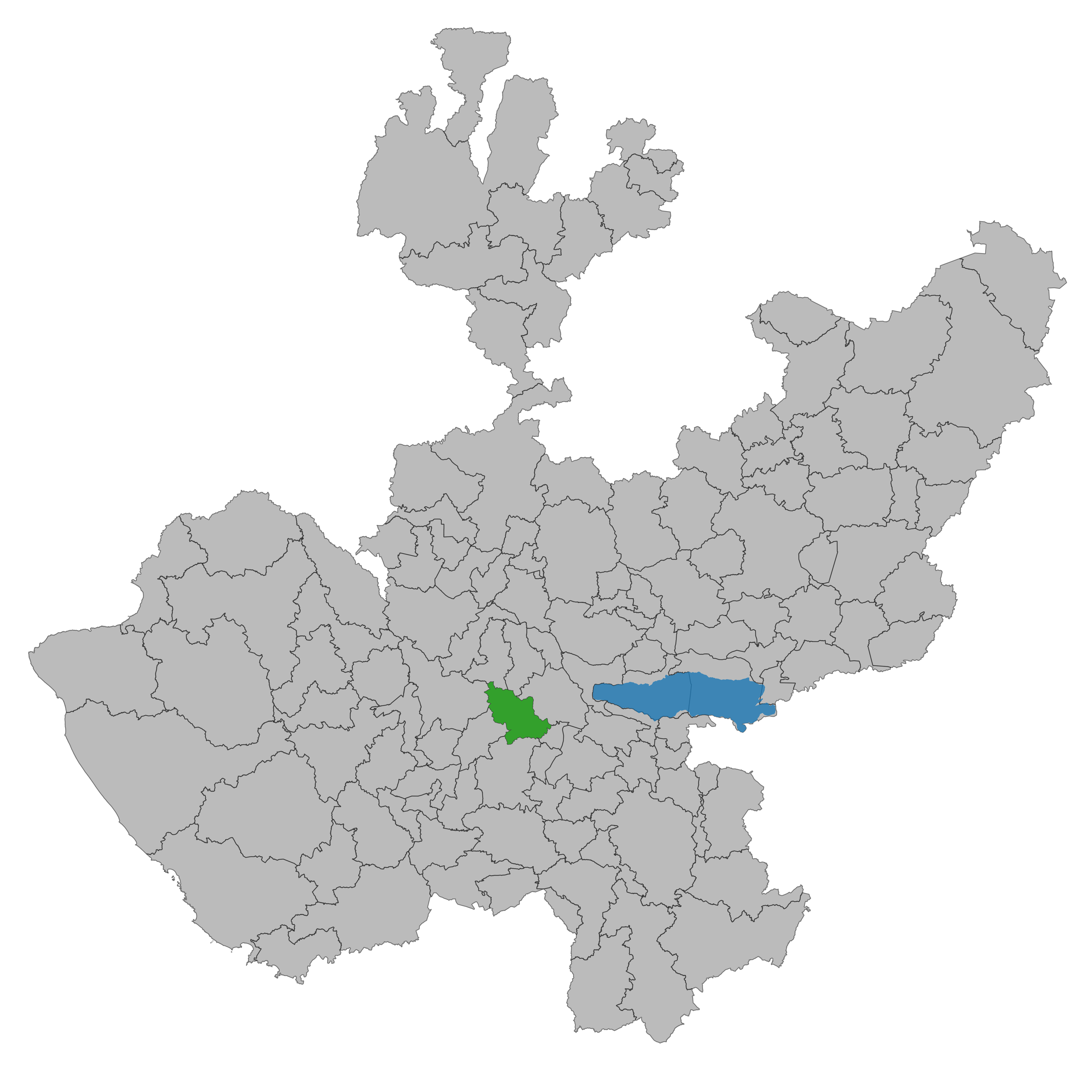
- Municipality of Brizuela in Jalisco

- Location in Mexico
- Coordinates: 20°11′N 103°42′W
- Country: Mexico
- State: Jalisco

Area
  - Total: 355.8 km^{2} (137.4 sq mi)
  - Town: 3.96 km^{2} (1.53 sq mi)

Population (2020 census)
  - Total: 7,758
  - Density: 21.80/km^{2} (56.47/sq mi)
  - Town: 6,434
  - Town density: 1,620/km^{2} (4,210/sq mi)
- Time zone: UTC-6 (Central (US Central))

Atemajac de Brizuela is a municipality and small town in the southeast sierra of Jalisco, Mexico, 64 km southwest of Guadalajara, between Highways 80 and 401. The municipality had a population of 6,367 in 2014.

The town received some notice in July 2008 in the nationally syndicated American comic strip Gil Thorp as the place to which Milford High baseball player—an undocumented immigrant—Elmer Vargas is deported.

== History ==
The region was inhabited by Otomi, head Indians. The spiritual conquest was mainly carried out by the Franciscan Juna de Padilla. The town was first in the place called Jaconoxtle and in the first half of the eighteenth century settled on the current site. With the conquest, Atemajac was nestled among the towns of the so-called Province of Ávalos and subsequently the provinces attached to Nueva Galicia were left.

On November 22, 1824, by Art. 9 (which adds the articles of the State Provisional Division Plan) it was decreed: The towns of Atemajac and Juanacatlán will be added to the department of Zacoalco. It belonged to the fourth canton of Sayula and third department of Zacoalco.

On April 25, 1903, by decree 997, the State Congress issued a decree that says: The population of Atemajac de las Tablas, from the 4th Canton of the state, will be referred to as Atemajac de Brizuela. Such designation was in honor of Colonel Miguel Brizuela. Atemajac de Brizuela exists as a municipality since 1884, by decree of April 4 called before Atemajac de las Tablas.

== Geography ==
=== Location ===
Atemajac de Brizuela is located south of the state at coordinates 20º05'00 "at 20º16'30" north latitude, and 103º35'00 "at 103º57'20" west longitude, at a height of 2,250 meters above the level from sea.

The municipality of Atemajac de Brizuela borders to the north with the municipalities of Cocula, Villa Corona, Zacoalco de Torres; to the east with the municipalities of Zacoalco de Torres, Techaluta de Montenegro; to the south with the municipalities of Techaluta de Montenegro, Tapalpa and Chiquilistlán; to the west with the municipalities of Chiquilistlán, Tecolotlán and Cocula.

=== Topography ===
The rugged areas (53%) predominate with heights ranging from 2,250 to 2,600 meters above sea level in some of the foothills of the Sierra de Tapalpa. There are also flat areas (30%) with heights of 2,200 to 2,250 meters above sea level and semi-flat areas (17%).

=== Terrain ===
The territory is made up of land belonging to the tertiary period. The composition of the soils is of predominant types Feozem Háplico, Cambisol Chromic and Andosol Mólica. The municipality has a territorial area of 19,157 ha, of which 5,229 are used for agricultural purposes, 3,394 in livestock, 10,361 are for forest use and 173 hectares are urban land. As far as the property is concerned, an extension of 10,604 hectares is private and another of 8,553 hectares is ejidal; There is no communal property.

=== Hydrography ===
The hydrological resources available to the municipality are: the Carrizal River; the streams: Agua Prieta, San Juan and El Salto; there are also several springs.

=== Climate ===
The climate is semi-dry, with dry winter, and mild, with mild winter. The average annual temperature is 19 °C, with a maximum of 26 °C and a minimum of 0 °C. The rainfall regime is recorded in the months of June and July, with an average rainfall of 814.5 millimeters. The annual average of days with frosts is 39. The prevailing winds are in the northwest direction.

== Government ==
=== Municipal presidents ===
Municipal president	Term	Political party	Notes
Ramón Montes	1931–1932	PNR	
Francisco Dávila Castillo	1933–1934	PNR	
Pedro Guadalupe	1935–1936	PNR	
Ramón Espinoza	1937–1939	PNR PRM	
Cecilio Vázquez	1939–1940	PRM	
Crescenciano Cuevas	1941–1942	PRM	
Octaviano Castillo R.	1943–1944	PRM	
Manuel León Velasco	1945–1946	PRM	
José González Aguilar	1947–1948	PRI	
Macario Tejeda Castillo	1948–1952	PRI	
Manuel Reynoso León	1953–1955	PRI	
Manuel León Velasco	1956–1958	PRI	
J. Carlos Vázquez Tejeda	1959–1961	PRI	
Francisco Sigala Nodal	1962–1964	PRI	
Fidel Mendoza González	1965–1967	PRI	
Manuel Vázquez Tejeda	1968–1970	PRI	
Javier Dávila de la Torre	1971–1973	PRI	
Vicente Castro Dávila	1974–1976	PRI	
Rubén Dávila Sigala	1977-1979	PRI	
Francisco Sigala Nodal	1980–1982	PRI	
Blanca Isaura Vázquez Morones	1983–1985	PRI	
Elías Dávila Tejeda	1986–1988	PRI	
Martín Reynoso Dávila	1989–1991	PRI	
Martiniano León León	1992–1995	PRI	
José Ramírez Dávila Vázquez	1995–1998	PRI	
José Mendoza Echeverría	01-01-1998–31-12-2000	PAN	
Manuel Francisco Reynoso Dávila	01-01-2001–31-12-2003	PRI	
Esther León Dávila	01-01-2004–31-12-2006	PAN	
Mirella Rafaela León Castro	01-01-2007–31-12-2009	PRI	
Amado Leal de la Cruz	01-01-2010–30-09-2012	PRI; Panal	Coalition "Alliance for Jalisco"
Belén Córdova Dávila	01-10-2012–30-09-2015	PRI; PVEM	Coalition "Compromise for Jalisco"
María Felícitas Aguilar Ibarra	01-10-2015–30-09-2018	PAN	
J. Jesús Monroy Moreno	01-10-2018–30-09-2021	Panal	
Santiago León Castro	01-10-2021–	PAN	
