= Techaluta de Montenegro =

- Municipality and town
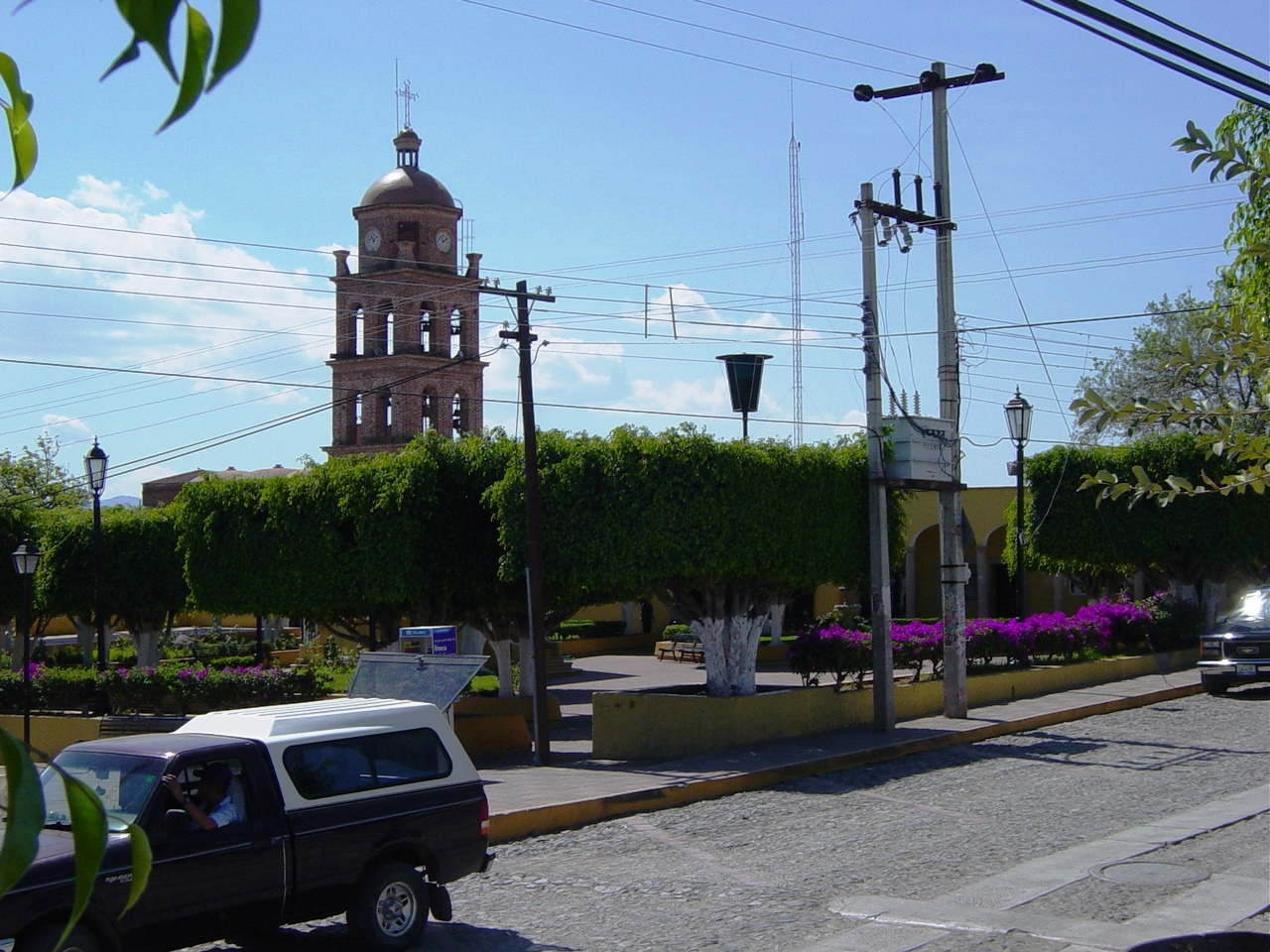

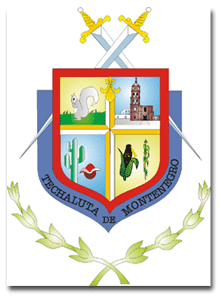
- Coat of arms

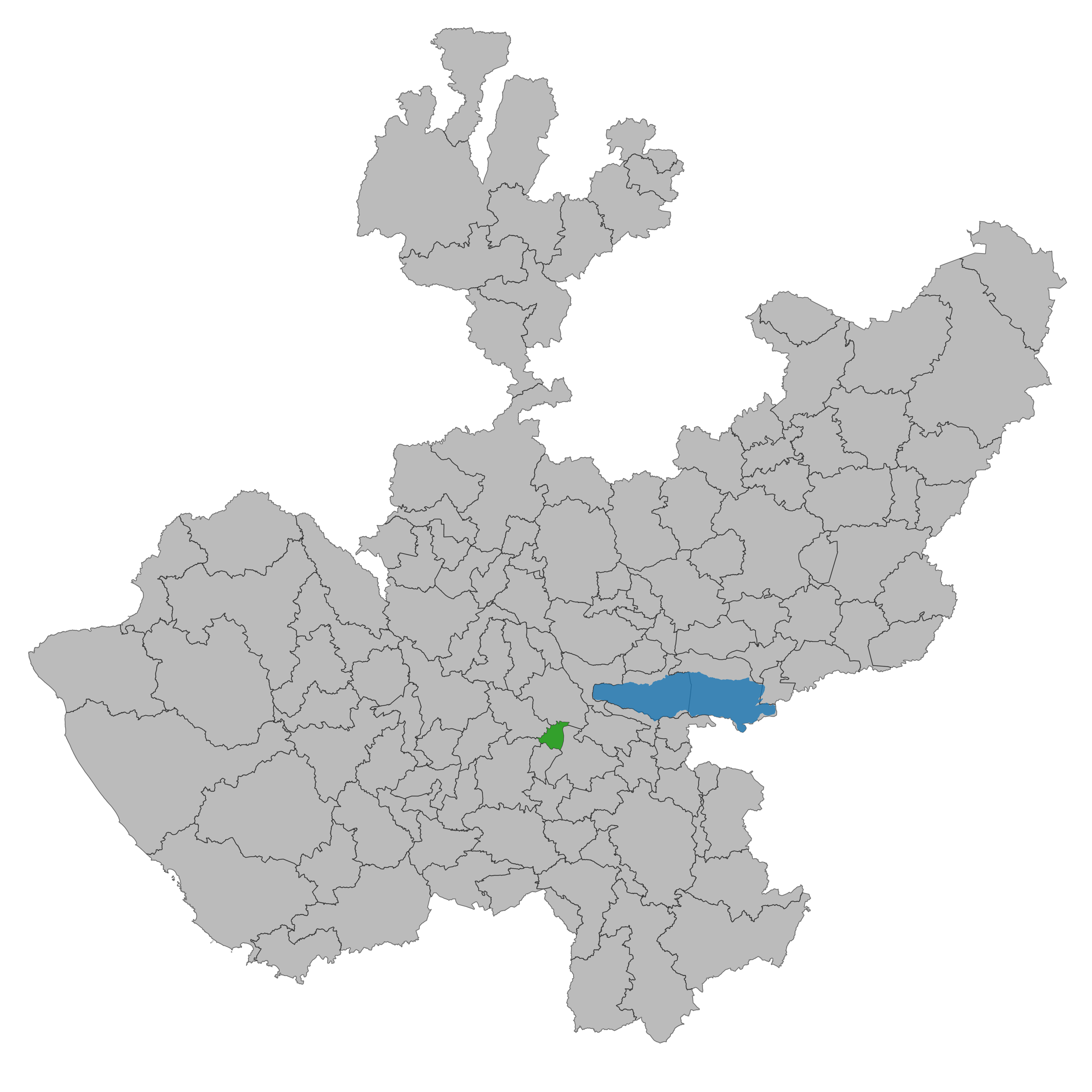
- Location of the municipality in Jalisco

- Location in Mexico
- Coordinates: 20°4′27″N 103°33′10″W
- Country: Mexico
- State: Jalisco

Area
  - Total: 79.24 km^{2} (30.59 sq mi)
  - Town: 1.8 km^{2} (0.69 sq mi)

Population (2020 census)
  - Total: 4,072
  - Density: 51.39/km^{2} (133.1/sq mi)
  - Town: 2,856
  - Town density: 1,600/km^{2} (4,100/sq mi)
- Time zone: UTC-6 (Central Standard Time)

Techaluta de Montenegro is a town and municipality, in Jalisco in central-western Mexico, being the smallest municipality in Jalisco. The municipality covers an area of 79.24 km^{2}.

As of 2005, the municipality had a total population of 3,190.
