= Amacueca =

- Municipality and town
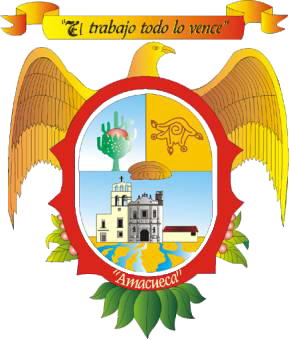
- Coat of arms

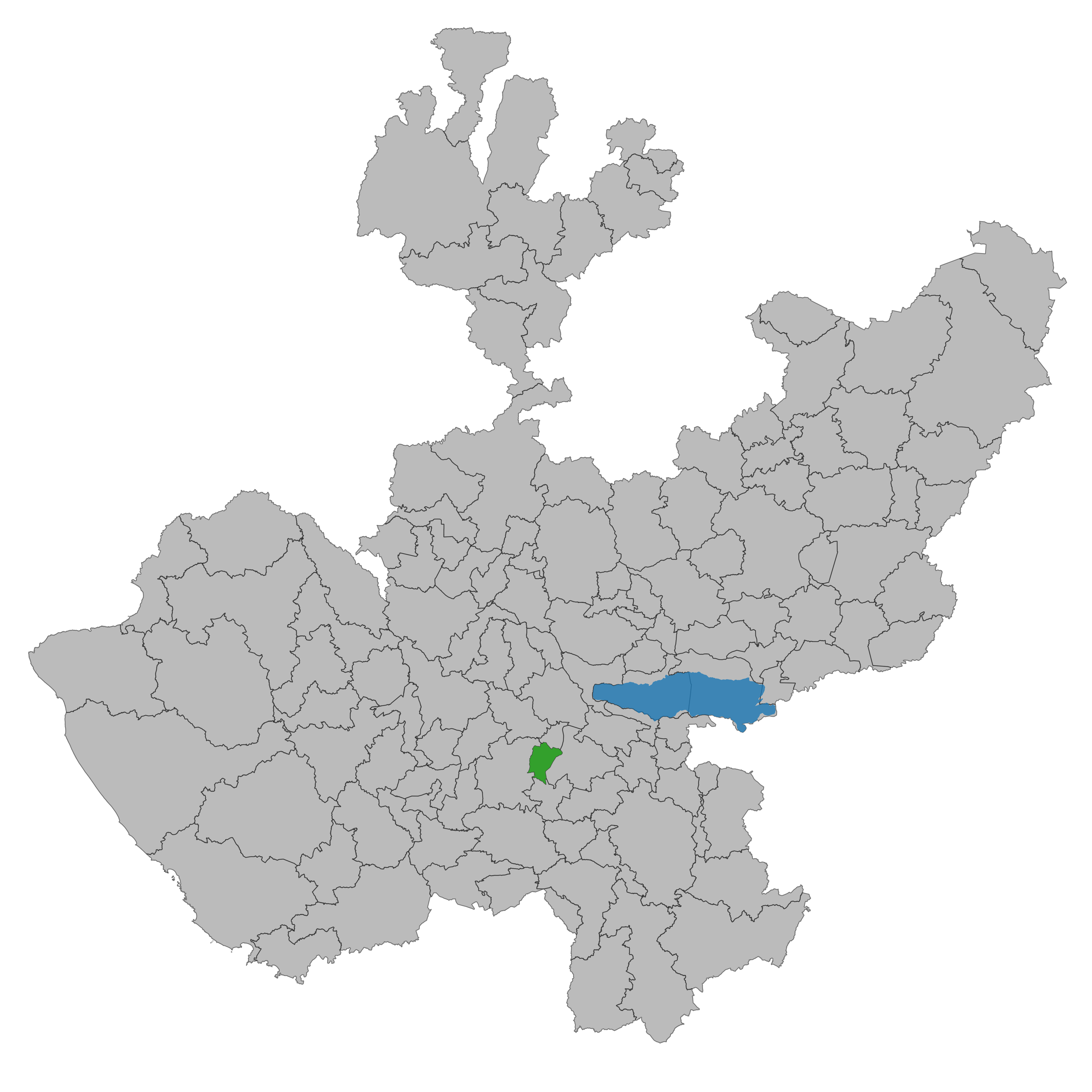
- Location of the municipality in Jalisco

- Location in Mexico
- Coordinates: 19°56′N 103°04′W
- Country: Mexico
- State: Jalisco

Area
  - Total: 124.8 km^{2} (48.2 sq mi)
  - Town: 3.2 km^{2} (1.2 sq mi)

Population (2020 census)
  - Total: 5,743
  - Density: 46.02/km^{2} (119.2/sq mi)
  - Town: 3,025
  - Town density: 950/km^{2} (2,400/sq mi)

Amacueca is a town and municipality, in Jalisco in central-western Mexico. The municipality covers an area of 124.8 km^{2}.

As of 2005, the municipality had a total population of 5,065.

== Government ==
=== Municipal presidents ===
Municipal president	Term	Political party	Notes
J. Apolinar Rodríguez Chávez	1928		
Olivio Fernández	1929		
Miguel Meza Barragán	1929		
José Ma. Aguayo Meza	1929	PNR	
José Gudiño Meza	1930	PNR	
Francisco Pérez Chávez	1930	PNR	
José Gudiño Meza	1931	PNR	
J. Jesús Landeros Amezola	1932-1933	PNR	
José Ma. Aguayo Meza	1934	PNR	
Elías Pérez	1935	PNR	
Ricardo Sánchez Castillo	1936–1937	PNR	
Gabriel Manzo Benites	1938	PNR	
Vicente Cruz Pinto	1938	PNR	
Agustín Rojas González	1938	PRM	
José Rodríguez Peña	1939–1940	PRM	
Manuel Díaz Novoa	1941–1942	PRM	
José Barragán Rodríguez	1943–1944	PRM	
Gilberto Meza Gutiérrez	1945–1946	PRM	
Florencio Gudiño Meza	1947	PRI	
Enrique Cruz de la Cruz	1948	PRI	
Antonio Contreras Gómez	1949	PRI	
Vicente Franco Guzmán	1950–1951	PRI	
Jesús Barragán Rodríguez	1952	PRI	
Salvador Valenzuela Maldonado	1953–1955	PRI	
Ponciano Rojas Pérez	1956–1957	PRI	
Florentino Covarrubias Sánchez	1958	PRI	
Ponciano Rojas Pérez	1958	PRI	
J. Jesús B. Rodríguez	1958	PRI	
Salvador Meza Díaz	1960–1961	PRI	
Francisco Valdivia Sandoval	1962–1964	PRI	
Emilio García Gutiérrez	1965–1967	PRI	
Gilberto López García	1968–1970	PRI	
J. Cruz Figueroa Fajardo	1971–1973	PRI	
José Anastacio Rodríguez	1974–1976	PRI	
Andrés Sánchez González	1977–1979	PRI	
Clemente Franco Valdivia	1980–1982	PRI	
Vicente Solís Peña	1983–1985	PRI	
Andrés Aguayo Aguilar	1986–1988	PRI	
Manuel Meza Sánchez	1989–1992	PRI	
Ma. del Socorro Barragán Chávez	1992–1995	PRI	
Luis Franco Llamas	1995–1998	PAN	
Rigoberto Muñoz Rodríguez	01-01-1998–31-12-2000	PRI	
Luis Franco Llamas	01-01-2001–31-12-2003	PAN	
Jesús González Guajardo	01-01-2004–31-12-2006	PAN	
Enrique Rojas Díaz	01-01-2007–31-12-2009	PRI	
Efraín Ramírez González	01-01-2010–30-09-2012	PRI; Panal	Coalition "Alliance for Jalisco"
Enrique Rojas Díaz	01-10-2012–30-09-2015	PRI; PVEM	Coalition "Compromise for Jalisco"
César Augusto Anaya Valenzuela	01-10-2015–30-09-2018	PRI	
Luz Elvira Durán Valenzuela	01-10-2018–2021	PAN; PRD; MC	She applied for a temporary leave, to run for reelection, which she got
Neri Quintero Barragán	2021	PAN; PRD; MC	Acting president municipal
Luz Elvira Durán Valenzuela	01-10-2021–30-09-2024	MC	She was reelected on 6 June 2021
Neri Quintero Barragán	01-10-2024–	MC	
