= Area codes in Mexico by code (300–399) =

The 300–399 range of area codes in Mexico is reserved for the states of Colima, Jalisco, Michoacán, Nayarit, and Zacatecas. The country code of Mexico is 52.

For other areas, see Area codes in Mexico by code.

| City | State | Code | Ref. |
|---|---|---|---|
| Bellavista | Nayarit | 311 | |
| El Jicote | Nayarit | 311 | |
| Francisco I. Madero (Puga) | Nayarit | 311 | |
| Pantanal | Nayarit | 311 | |
| San Cayetano | Nayarit | 311 | |
| San Francisco | Nayarit | 311 | |
| Santiago de Pochotitan | Nayarit | 311 | |
| Tepic | Nayarit | 311 | |
| Testerazo (El Refugio) | Nayarit | 311 | |
| Xalisco | Nayarit | 311 | |
| Alzada | Colima | 312 | |
| Chiapa | Colima | 312 | |
| Ciudad de Villa de Alvarez | Colima | 312 | |
| Cofradía de Suchitlán | Colima | 312 | |
| Colima | Colima | 312 | |
| Comala | Colima | 312 | |
| Cuauhtémoc | Colima | 312 | |
| El Chanal | Colima | 312 | |
| El Trapiche | Colima | 312 | |
| Los Ortices | Colima | 312 | |
| Los Tepames | Colima | 312 | |
| Piscila | Colima | 312 | |
| Pueblo Juárez (La Magdalena) | Colima | 312 | |
| Quesería | Colima | 312 | |
| Zacualpan | Colima | 312 | |
| La Estrella | Jalisco | 312 | |
| La Higuera | Jalisco | 312 | |
| Pihuamo | Jalisco | 312 | |
| San Marcos | Jalisco | 312 | |
| Tonila | Jalisco | 312 | |
| Armería | Colima | 313 | |
| Augusto Gómez Villanueva | Colima | 313 | |
| Cerro de Ortega | Colima | 313 | |
| Ciudad de Armería | Colima | 313 | |
| Colonia Bravo | Colima | 313 | |
| Coquimatlán | Colima | 313 | |
| Cuyutlán | Colima | 313 | |
| Ixtlahuacán | Colima | 313 | |
| Madrid | Colima | 313 | |
| Rincón de López | Colima | 313 | |
| Tecolapa | Colima | 313 | |
| Tecomán | Colima | 313 | |
| Aquila | Michoacán | 313 | |
| Coahuayana de Hidalgo | Michoacán | 313 | |
| Coahuayana Viejo | Michoacán | 313 | |
| La Placita de Morelos | Michoacán | 313 | |
| San Juan de Alima | Michoacán | 313 | |
| Camotlán de Miraflores | Colima | 314 | |
| El Colomo | Colima | 314 | |
| El Naranjo | Colima | 314 | |
| Jalipa | Colima | 314 | |
| Manzanillo | Colima | 314 | |
| Minatitlán | Colima | 314 | |
| Venustiano Carranza (Cualata) | Colima | 314 | |
| Vida del Mar | Colima | 314 | |
| Barra de Navidad | Jalisco | 315 | |
| Careyes | Jalisco | 315 | |
| Cihuatlán | Jalisco | 315 | |
| Emiliano Zapata | Jalisco | 315 | |
| La Manzanilla | Jalisco | 315 | |
| San Mateo | Jalisco | 315 | |
| San Patricio (Melaque) | Jalisco | 315 | |
| Ayutla | Jalisco | 316 | |
| Cuautla | Jalisco | 316 | |
| San Clemente | Jalisco | 316 | |
| Unión de Tula | Jalisco | 316 | |
| Ahuacapan | Jalisco | 317 | |
| Autlán | Jalisco | 317 | |
| El Chante | Jalisco | 317 | |
| El Corcovado | Jalisco | 317 | |
| El Mentidero | Jalisco | 317 | |
| Las Lagunillas | Jalisco | 317 | |
| Las Paredes | Jalisco | 317 | |
| Mezquitán | Jalisco | 317 | |
| Chilapa | Nayarit | 319 | |
| Coamiles | Nayarit | 319 | |
| Cofradía de Cuyutlán | Nayarit | 319 | |
| Colonia 18 de Marzo | Nayarit | 319 | |
| El Tamarindo | Nayarit | 319 | |
| El Venado | Nayarit | 319 | |
| La Boquita | Nayarit | 319 | |
| Las Peñitas | Nayarit | 319 | |
| Palma Grande | Nayarit | 319 | |
| Pimentillo | Nayarit | 319 | |
| Rosamorada | Nayarit | 319 | |
| Ruiz | Nayarit | 319 | |
| Tuxpan | Nayarit | 319 | |
| Unión de Corrientes | Nayarit | 319 | |
| Ayuquila | Jalisco | 321 | |
| El Grullo | Jalisco | 321 | |
| El Limón | Jalisco | 321 | |
| El Palmar de San Antonio | Jalisco | 321 | |
| Campamento Sarh | Jalisco | 322 | |
| Campo Acosta | Jalisco | 322 | |
| El Tuito | Jalisco | 322 | |
| Ixtapa | Jalisco | 322 | |
| José María Morelos | Jalisco | 322 | |
| La Cruz de Loreto | Jalisco | 322 | |
| La Desembocada | Jalisco | 322 | |
| Las Juntas y los Veranos | Jalisco | 322 | |
| Las Palmas de Arriba | Jalisco | 322 | |
| Mismaloya | Jalisco | 322 | |
| Puerto Vallarta | Jalisco | 322 | |
| San Sebastián del Oeste | Jalisco | 322 | |
| Tequesquite | Jalisco | 322 | |
| Tomatlán | Jalisco | 322 | |
| Yelapa | Jalisco | 322 | |
| Las Jarretaderas | Nayarit | 322 | |
| Nuevo Vallarta | Nayarit | 322 | |
| Amapa | Nayarit | 323 | |
| Aticama | Nayarit | 323 | |
| Boca de Camichin | Nayarit | 323 | |
| Cañada del Tabaco | Nayarit | 323 | |
| El Botadero | Nayarit | 323 | |
| El Tizate | Nayarit | 323 | |
| Estación Yago | Nayarit | 323 | |
| Guadalupe Victoria (La Virocha) | Nayarit | 323 | |
| La Presa | Nayarit | 323 | |
| Mexcaltitán | Nayarit | 323 | |
| Pozo de Ibarra | Nayarit | 323 | |
| Puerta de Mangos | Nayarit | 323 | |
| San Blas | Nayarit | 323 | |
| Santa Cruz de Miramar | Nayarit | 323 | |
| Santiago Ixcuintla | Nayarit | 323 | |
| Sauta | Nayarit | 323 | |
| Sentispac | Nayarit | 323 | |
| Villa Hidalgo (El Nuevo) | Nayarit | 323 | |
| Villa Juárez (La Trozada) | Nayarit | 323 | |
| Ahuacatlán | Nayarit | 324 | |
| Amatlán de Cañas | Nayarit | 324 | |
| El Rosario | Nayarit | 324 | |
| Estancia de Los López | Nayarit | 324 | |
| Ixtlán del Río | Nayarit | 324 | |
| Jala | Nayarit | 324 | |
| Rosa Blanca | Nayarit | 324 | |
| Tepuzhuacán | Nayarit | 324 | |
| Tetitlán | Nayarit | 324 | |
| Uzeta | Nayarit | 324 | |
| Acaponeta | Nayarit | 325 | |
| Huajicori | Nayarit | 325 | |
| San Marcos (Mp. Zacoalco de Torres) | Jalisco | 326 | |
| Atemajac de Brizuela | Jalisco | 326 | |
| Barranca de Otates | Jalisco | 326 | |
| Barranca de Santa Clara (Barranca de Enmedio) | Jalisco | 326 | |
| San Andrés Figueroa | Jalisco | 326 | |
| Verdía | Jalisco | 326 | |
| Zacoalco | Jalisco | 326 | |
| Amado Nervo (El Conde) | Nayarit | 327 | |
| Chacala | Nayarit | 327 | |
| Chapalilla | Nayarit | 327 | |
| Colonia Moderna (Moderna) | Nayarit | 327 | |
| Compostela | Nayarit | 327 | |
| El Capomo | Nayarit | 327 | |
| Felipe Carrillo Puerto | Nayarit | 327 | |
| Ixtapa de la Concepción | Nayarit | 327 | |
| Jalcocotán | Nayarit | 327 | |
| Juan Escutia (Borbollón) | Nayarit | 327 | |
| La Labor | Nayarit | 327 | |
| La Peñita de Jaltemba | Nayarit | 327 | |
| Las Varas | Nayarit | 327 | |
| Lo de Marcos | Nayarit | 327 | |
| Mecatán | Nayarit | 327 | |
| Monteón | Nayarit | 327 | |
| Navarrete | Nayarit | 327 | |
| Rincón de Guayabitos | Nayarit | 327 | |
| San José de Mojarras | Nayarit | 327 | |
| San Pedro Lagunillas | Nayarit | 327 | |
| Santa María del Oro | Nayarit | 327 | |
| Zacualpan | Nayarit | 327 | |
| Changuitiro | Michoacán | 328 | |
| Churintzio | Michoacán | 328 | |
| Colesio | Michoacán | 328 | |
| Ecuandureo | Michoacán | 328 | |
| El Capulín | Michoacán | 328 | |
| El Cuenqueño | Michoacán | 328 | |
| Huapamacato | Michoacán | 328 | |
| Ixtlán de los Hervores | Michoacán | 328 | |
| La Estanzuela | Michoacán | 328 | |
| La Luz | Michoacán | 328 | |
| La Noria | Michoacán | 328 | |
| La Plaza de Fco. J. Mugica (Plaza del Limón) | Michoacán | 328 | |
| Las Fuentes | Michoacán | 328 | |
| Los Pilares | Michoacán | 328 | |
| Quiringuicharo (La Hacienda) | Michoacán | 328 | |
| Tecomatán | Michoacán | 328 | |
| Ucacuaro | Michoacán | 328 | |
| Vista Hermosa | Michoacán | 328 | |
| Bucerías | Nayarit | 329 | |
| Cruz de Juanacaxtle | Nayarit | 329 | |
| El Colomo | Nayarit | 329 | |
| Emiliano Zapata | Nayarit | 329 | |
| Higuera Blanca | Nayarit | 329 | |
| Mezcales | Nayarit | 329 | |
| San José del Valle | Nayarit | 329 | |
| San Juan de Abajo | Nayarit | 329 | |
| San Vicente | Nayarit | 329 | |
| Sayulita | Nayarit | 329 | |
| Valle de Banderas | Nayarit | 329 | |
| Ciudad Guzmán | Jalisco | 341 | |
| El Rincón | Jalisco | 341 | |
| Gómez Farías | Jalisco | 341 | |
| La Mesa (El Fresnito) | Jalisco | 341 | |
| Tasinaxtla (La Cañada) | Jalisco | 341 | |
| Villa Lázaro Cárdenas (El Aserradero) | Jalisco | 341 | |
| Zapotiltic | Jalisco | 341 | |
| Sayula | Jalisco | 342 | |
| Ejutla | Jalisco | 343 | |
| El Jazmín | Jalisco | 343 | |
| Juanacatlán | Jalisco | 343 | |
| La Frontera | Jalisco | 343 | |
| San Gabriel | Jalisco | 343 | |
| San Isidro | Jalisco | 343 | |
| San José del Carmen | Jalisco | 343 | |
| Tapalpa | Jalisco | 343 | |
| Tolimán | Jalisco | 343 | |
| Tonaya | Jalisco | 343 | |
| Tuxcacuesco | Jalisco | 343 | |
| Zapotitlán de Vadillo | Jalisco | 343 | |
| Huisquilco (Huiscuilco) | Jalisco | 344 | |
| Manalisco | Jalisco | 344 | |
| Mexticacán | Jalisco | 344 | |
| Yahualica | Jalisco | 344 | |
| Ayotlán | Jalisco | 345 | |
| Betania | Jalisco | 345 | |
| Buenos Aires | Jalisco | 345 | |
| Degollado | Jalisco | 345 | |
| Huascato | Jalisco | 345 | |
| La Concepción | Jalisco | 345 | |
| Santa Rita | Jalisco | 345 | |
| Belén del Refugio | Jalisco | 346 | |
| Mechoacanejo | Jalisco | 346 | |
| Teocaltiche | Jalisco | 346 | |
| Apulco | Zacatecas | 346 | |
| La Estancia | Zacatecas | 346 | |
| Nochistlán | Zacatecas | 346 | |
| Tlachichila | Zacatecas | 346 | |
| Toyahua de Abajo | Zacatecas | 346 | |
| Mirandillas | Jalisco | 347 | |
| San Julián | Jalisco | 347 | |
| San Miguel El Alto | Jalisco | 347 | |
| Valle de Guadalupe | Jalisco | 347 | |
| Arandas | Jalisco | 348 | |
| Jesús María | Jalisco | 348 | |
| Josefino de Allende | Jalisco | 348 | |
| La Trinidad | Jalisco | 348 | |
| San Ignacio Cerro Gordo | Jalisco | 348 | |
| Santa María del Valle | Jalisco | 348 | |
| Santiaguito de Velázquez | Jalisco | 348 | |
| Atengo | Jalisco | 349 | |
| Juchitlán | Jalisco | 349 | |
| Los Guajes (San José de los Guajes) | Jalisco | 349 | |
| Quila (Quila El Grande) | Jalisco | 349 | |
| Tecolotlán | Jalisco | 349 | |
| Tenamaxtlán | Jalisco | 349 | |
| Aquiles Serdán (Santiaguillo) | Michoacán | 351 | |
| Ario de Rayón | Michoacán | 351 | |
| Atacheo de Regalado | Michoacán | 351 | |
| El Sauz de Abajo | Michoacán | 351 | |
| Jacona de Plancarte | Michoacán | 351 | |
| La Ladera | Michoacán | 351 | |
| La Sauceda | Michoacán | 351 | |
| Romero de Torres | Michoacán | 351 | |
| Zamora | Michoacán | 351 | |
| Cuevas de Morales | Guanajuato | 352 | |
| El Algodonal | Michoacán | 352 | |
| La Piedad | Michoacán | 352 | |
| Los Guajes | Michoacán | 352 | |
| Paredones | Michoacán | 352 | |
| Patzímaro de Aviña (Patzímaro del Rincón) | Michoacán | 352 | |
| Ticuitaco (Tocuitaco) | Michoacán | 352 | |
| Zaragoza | Michoacán | 352 | |
| Abadiano (Los Bajos) | Michoacán | 353 | |
| Cerrito Colorado | Michoacán | 353 | |
| Cumuatillo | Michoacán | 353 | |
| El Fortín | Michoacán | 353 | |
| El Fresno, Michoacán | Michoacán | 353 | |
| Jaripo | Michoacán | 353 | |
| Jiquilpan de Juárez | Michoacán | 353 | |
| La Magdalena | Michoacán | 353 | |
| (La Palma de Jesús) | Michoacán | 353 | |
| Pajarearán | Michoacán | 353 | |
| Pueblo Viejo | Michoacán | 353 | |
| Sahuayo | Michoacán | 353 | |
| San Antonio Guaracha | Michoacán | 353 | |
| Venustiano Carranza | Michoacán | 353 | |
| Manuel M. Dieguez | Jalisco | 354 | |
| Atapan | Michoacán | 354 | |
| Gildardo Magaña (Los Angeles) | Michoacán | 354 | |
| Guascuaro de Mugica | Michoacán | 354 | |
| J. Jesús Díaz Tzirio | Michoacán | 354 | |
| La Laguneta | Michoacán | 354 | |
| Cotija de la Paz | Michoacán | 354 | |
| Los Limones | Michoacán | 354 | |
| Los Palillos | Michoacán | 354 | |
| Los Reyes | Michoacán | 354 | |
| Nuevo Zirosto | Michoacán | 354 | |
| Pamatacuaro | Michoacán | 354 | |
| Peribán de Ramos | Michoacán | 354 | |
| San Francisco Periban | Michoacán | 354 | |
| San Isidro | Michoacán | 354 | |
| Tacatzcuaro | Michoacán | 354 | |
| Tinguindín | Michoacán | 354 | |
| Tocumbo | Michoacán | 354 | |
| Zacan | Michoacán | 354 | |
| Zicuicho | Michoacán | 354 | |
| Adolfo Ruíz Continez (Capricho) | Michoacán | 355 | |
| Carapán | Michoacán | 355 | |
| Chilchota | Michoacán | 355 | |
| Colonia Las Malvinas | Michoacán | 355 | |
| Etucuaro | Michoacán | 355 | |
| Los Nogales | Michoacán | 355 | |
| Patambán (Patambam) | Michoacán | 355 | |
| San Antonio Ocampo (Rincón del Tepetate) | Michoacán | 355 | |
| Tangancícuaro | Michoacán | 355 | |
| Tenguecho | Michoacán | 355 | |
| El Tequesquite | Michoacán | 356 | |
| Las Cieneguitas | Michoacán | 356 | |
| Los Charcos | Michoacán | 356 | |
| Monteleón | Michoacán | 356 | |
| Tanhuato de Guerrero | Michoacán | 356 | |
| Tarimoro | Michoacán | 356 | |
| Tinaja de Vargas | Michoacán | 356 | |
| Yurécuaro | Michoacán | 356 | |
| Casimiro Castillo | Jalisco | 357 | |
| Cuautitlán | Jalisco | 357 | |
| El Chico | Jalisco | 357 | |
| La Huerta | Jalisco | 357 | |
| Lo Arado | Jalisco | 357 | |
| Los Tecomates (Piedra Pesada) | Jalisco | 357 | |
| Tequesquitlán | Jalisco | 357 | |
| Villa Purificación | Jalisco | 357 | |
| Arroyo Hondo | Jalisco | 358 | |
| La Garita | Jalisco | 358 | |
| San Francisco | Jalisco | 358 | |
| Tamazula | Jalisco | 358 | |
| Villa de Contla (Contla) | Jalisco | 358 | |
| Vista Hermosa (Santa Cruz del Cortijo) | Jalisco | 358 | |
| El Colorado (Zerecuato) | Michoacán | 359 | |
| Guandaro | Michoacán | 359 | |
| La Luz | Michoacán | 359 | |
| Numerán | Michoacán | 359 | |
| Patambarillo | Michoacán | 359 | |
| Penjamillo | Michoacán | 359 | |
| San Antonio Carupo | Michoacán | 359 | |
| San José de Rábago | Michoacán | 359 | |
| Santa Fe del Río | Michoacán | 359 | |
| Tirimácuaro (Valanciana) | Michoacán | 359 | |
| Zinaparo | Michoacán | 359 | |
| Ziquitaro | Michoacán | 359 | |
| Atenquique | Jalisco | 371 | |
| Tecalitlán | Jalisco | 371 | |
| Tuxpan | Jalisco | 371 | |
| Amacueca | Jalisco | 372 | |
| Atoyac | Jalisco | 372 | |
| Citala | Jalisco | 372 | |
| Cofradía | Jalisco | 372 | |
| Concepción de Buenos Aires | Jalisco | 372 | |
| Cuyacapan | Jalisco | 372 | |
| El Zapote | Jalisco | 372 | |
| La Manzanilla de La Paz | Jalisco | 372 | |
| Teocuitatlán de Corona | Jalisco | 372 | |
| Unión de Guadalupe | Jalisco | 372 | |
| Cuquío | Jalisco | 373 | |
| Ixtlahuacán del Río | Jalisco | 373 | |
| Las Cruces | Jalisco | 373 | |
| Matatlán | Jalisco | 373 | |
| Palos Altos | Jalisco | 373 | |
| San Antonio de los Vázquez | Jalisco | 373 | |
| San Cristóbal de la Barranca | Jalisco | 373 | |
| San José de las Flores | Jalisco | 373 | |
| Santa Fe | Jalisco | 373 | |
| Saucillo de Maldonado | Jalisco | 373 | |
| Trejos | Jalisco | 373 | |
| Zapotlanejo | Jalisco | 373 | |
| Amatitán | Jalisco | 374 | |
| El Arenal | Jalisco | 374 | |
| El Salvador | Jalisco | 374 | |
| Santa Cruz del Astillero | Jalisco | 374 | |
| Santa Teresa | Jalisco | 374 | |
| Tequila | Jalisco | 374 | |
| Altavista de Ramos | Jalisco | 375 | |
| Ameca | Jalisco | 375 | |
| El Cabezón | Jalisco | 375 | |
| El Sabino | Jalisco | 375 | |
| Los Pocitos | Jalisco | 375 | |
| San Antonio Matute | Jalisco | 375 | |
| San Antonio Puerta de la Vega | Jalisco | 375 | |
| San Nicolás | Jalisco | 375 | |
| Texcalame | Jalisco | 375 | |
| El Trapiche de Abra | Jalisco | 375 | |
| Ajijic | Jalisco | 376 | |
| Atequiza | Jalisco | 376 | |
| Buenavista | Jalisco | 376 | |
| Chapala | Jalisco | 376 | |
| El Tepeguaje | Jalisco | 376 | |
| Ixtlahuacán de los Membrillos | Jalisco | 376 | |
| Mezcala de los Romeros | Jalisco | 376 | |
| Mismaloya | Jalisco | 376 | |
| San Jacinto | Jalisco | 376 | |
| San Juan Tecomatlán | Jalisco | 376 | |
| San Luis Soyatlán | Jalisco | 376 | |
| San Pedro Itzican | Jalisco | 376 | |
| Santa Cruz de la Soledad | Jalisco | 376 | |
| Tizapan El Alto | Jalisco | 376 | |
| Villa Emiliano Zapata | Jalisco | 376 | |
| Agua Caliente | Jalisco | 377 | |
| Atotonilco El Bajo | Jalisco | 377 | |
| Camichines | Jalisco | 377 | |
| Cocula | Jalisco | 377 | |
| El Crucero de Santa María | Jalisco | 377 | |
| Estipac | Jalisco | 377 | |
| Tateposco (San José de Tateposc) | Jalisco | 377 | |
| Mezcala (Mp. Tepatitlán de Morelo) | Jalisco | 378 | |
| Acatic | Jalisco | 378 | |
| Capilla de Guadalupe | Jalisco | 378 | |
| Capilla de Milpillas (Milpillas) | Jalisco | 378 | |
| Ojo de Agua de Latillas | Jalisco | 378 | |
| Pegueros | Jalisco | 378 | |
| San José de Bazarte | Jalisco | 378 | |
| Tecomotlan | Jalisco | 378 | |
| Tepatitlan de Morelos | Jalisco | 378 | |
| Tierras Coloradas | Jalisco | 378 | |
| Cojumatlán | Michoacán | 381 | |
| El Sabino | Michoacán | 381 | |
| Ojo de Rana | Michoacán | 381 | |
| Palo Alto | Michoacán | 381 | |
| San José de Gracia | Michoacán | 381 | |
| San Miguel | Michoacán | 381 | |
| Mazamitla | Jalisco | 382 | |
| Quitupan | Jalisco | 382 | |
| Valle de Juárez | Jalisco | 382 | |
| Chavinda | Michoacán | 383 | |
| El Platanal | Michoacán | 383 | |
| La Cuestita | Michoacán | 383 | |
| La Esperanza | Michoacán | 383 | |
| Las Zarquillas | Michoacán | 383 | |
| Los Hucuares | Michoacán | 383 | |
| Santiago Tangamandapio | Michoacán | 383 | |
| Tarecuato | Michoacán | 383 | |
| Telonzo | Michoacán | 383 | |
| Villamar | Michoacán | 383 | |
| Cuisillos | Jalisco | 384 | |
| Las Navajas | Jalisco | 384 | |
| Tala | Jalisco | 384 | |
| Teuchitlán | Jalisco | 384 | |
| Buenavista | Jalisco | 385 | |
| Camajapita | Jalisco | 385 | |
| Chiquilistlán | Jalisco | 385 | |
| El Salitre | Jalisco | 385 | |
| Ipazoltic | Jalisco | 385 | |
| Los Guerrero | Jalisco | 385 | |
| San Martín Hidalgo | Jalisco | 385 | |
| San Nicolás de Acuña | Jalisco | 385 | |
| Tamazulita | Jalisco | 385 | |
| Ahualulco | Jalisco | 386 | |
| Antonio Escobedo | Jalisco | 386 | |
| El Carmen | Jalisco | 386 | |
| Etzatlán | Jalisco | 386 | |
| Hostotipaquillo | Jalisco | 386 | |
| La Estancia de Ayones | Jalisco | 386 | |
| La Quemada | Jalisco | 386 | |
| Magdalena | Jalisco | 386 | |
| Oconahua | Jalisco | 386 | |
| San Andrés | Jalisco | 386 | |
| San Marcos | Jalisco | 386 | |
| San Pedro | Jalisco | 386 | |
| Acatlán de Juárez | Jalisco | 387 | |
| Bellavista | Jalisco | 387 | |
| El Molino | Jalisco | 387 | |
| Huejotitan | Jalisco | 387 | |
| Jocotepec | Jalisco | 387 | |
| Las Trojes | Jalisco | 387 | |
| Potrerillos | Jalisco | 387 | |
| San Juan Cosala | Jalisco | 387 | |
| San Pedro Tesistán | Jalisco | 387 | |
| Villa Corona | Jalisco | 387 | |
| Zapotitán de Hidalgo | Jalisco | 387 | |
| Atenguillo | Jalisco | 388 | |
| Guachinango | Jalisco | 388 | |
| La Laja | Jalisco | 388 | |
| Los Volcanes | Jalisco | 388 | |
| Mascota | Jalisco | 388 | |
| Mixtlán | Jalisco | 388 | |
| San Antonio de los Macedo | Jalisco | 388 | |
| Talpa de Allende | Jalisco | 388 | |
| El Limón | Nayarit | 389 | |
| Milpas Viejas | Nayarit | 389 | |
| Quimichis | Nayarit | 389 | |
| San Felipe Aztatán | Nayarit | 389 | |
| Tecuala | Nayarit | 389 | |
| Atotonilco El Alto | Jalisco | 391 | |
| Francisco Javier Mina | Jalisco | 391 | |
| La Purísima | Jalisco | 391 | |
| Margaritas | Jalisco | 391 | |
| Nuevo Refugio de Afuera | Jalisco | 391 | |
| Nuevo Valle | Jalisco | 391 | |
| Otatlán | Jalisco | 391 | |
| Poncitlán | Jalisco | 391 | |
| San Antonio de Fernández | Jalisco | 391 | |
| San Isidro | Jalisco | 391 | |
| San José de Gracia | Jalisco | 391 | |
| San Miguel Zapotitlán | Jalisco | 391 | |
| Santa Cruz El Grande | Jalisco | 391 | |
| Tecualtitán | Jalisco | 391 | |
| Tototlán | Jalisco | 391 | |
| Zapotlán del Rey | Jalisco | 391 | |
| Jamay | Jalisco | 392 | |
| Joconoxtle (La Tuna) | Jalisco | 392 | |
| Ocotlán | Jalisco | 392 | |
| San José de la Paz | Jalisco | 392 | |
| San Martín de Zula (Zula) | Jalisco | 392 | |
| Condiro | Jalisco | 393 | |
| La Barca | Jalisco | 393 | |
| La Paz de Ordaz | Jalisco | 393 | |
| San Francisco de Rivas | Jalisco | 393 | |
| San José Casas Caídas | Jalisco | 393 | |
| San José de las Moras | Jalisco | 393 | |
| San Ramón | Jalisco | 393 | |
| Ibarra | Michoacán | 393 | |
| Cotija de la Paz | Michoacán | 394 | |
| El Barrio | Michoacán | 394 | |
| Vista Hermosa | Michoacán | 394 | |
| Mezquitic de la Magdalena | Jalisco | 395 | |
| San Diego de Alejandría | Jalisco | 395 | |
| San Juan de los Lagos | Jalisco | 395 | |
| Tlacuitapan | Jalisco | 395 | |
| Unión de San Antonio | Jalisco | 395 | |
