= La Placita =

La Placita may refer to:

- La Placita, Michoacan, Mexico
- La Placita, California, U.S., a former settlement in Riverside County
- La Placita, Colorado, a former settlement in southeastern Colorado
- La Iglesia de Nuestra Señora Reina de los Angeles, nicknamed La Placita, a Catholic church in Los Angeles, California, U.S.
- Olvera Street, Los Angeles, also known as "Placita Olvera"
