= Campo Acosta, Jalisco =

Town in Jalisco

Coordinates: 19°46′15″N 105°15′00″W

Campo Acosta is a small town in Tomatlán, Jalisco, Mexico. It has a population of 2,638. 0.83% of the inhabitants are Indigenous.
