= Zacualpan =

Zacualpan may refer to any of the following settlements in Mexico:

- Zacualpan, Colima, in the municipality of Comala
- Zacualpan, Guerrero, in the municipality of Atoyac de Álvarez
- Zacualpan, State of Mexico
- Zacualpan de Amilpas, Morelos
- Zacualpan, Nayarit
- San Jerónimo Zacualpan, Tlaxcala
- Zacualpan, Veracruz

== Similar names ==
- Zacualtipán, Hidalgo
