= Barranca de los Laureles =

Coordinates: 20°14′N 103°38′W

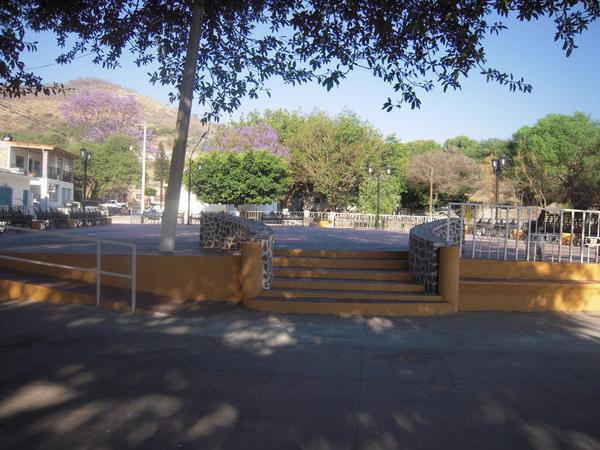
- View of the plaza
- Interactive map of Barranca de los Laureles
- Country: Mexico
- State: Jalisco
- Municipality: Zacoalco de Torres
- Elevation: 1,460 m (4,790 ft)

Population (2020)
  - Total: 330
- Time zone: UTC-6 (Central Standard Time)
  - Summer (DST): UTC-5 (Central Daylight Time)

Barranca de los Laureles is a town near the Municipal Seat of Zacoalco de Torres in State of Jalisco, Mexico. The town also has a Plaza where the residents use it to celebrate parties. The streets of La Barranca de los Laureles are paved with rocks. The population was 330 according to the 2020 census.

== Fiesta de Marzo ==
According to the town residents, the town has an old celebration called "Fiesta de Marzo", which translates as "The March Party". It is held every year starting on March 17, and ending on the 19th. In this party, the residents of La Barranca de Los Laureles celebrate the way of life, and a big Castillo is fired and "bandas" play folkloric tunes. There are also trampolines for the children. Food is a special part of the party and tacos, smoked corns, and drinks are served. Many people from nearby towns such as Barranca de Santa Clara and Barranca de Otates also come to join on the celebrations.

== Picture gallery ==
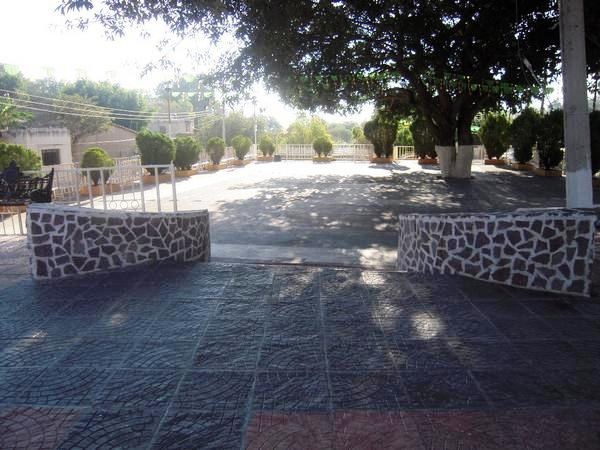
The plaza of La Barranca

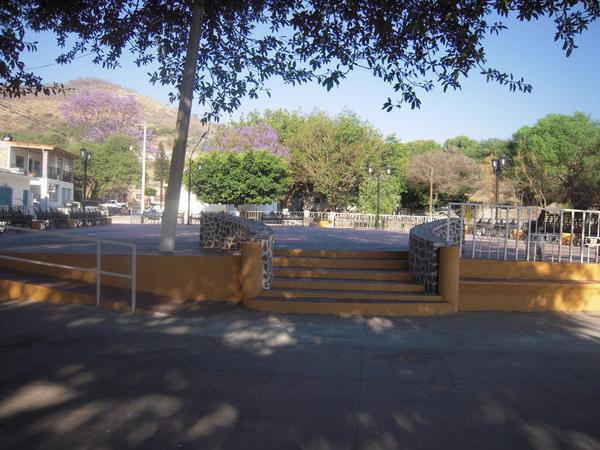
Top view of the plaza

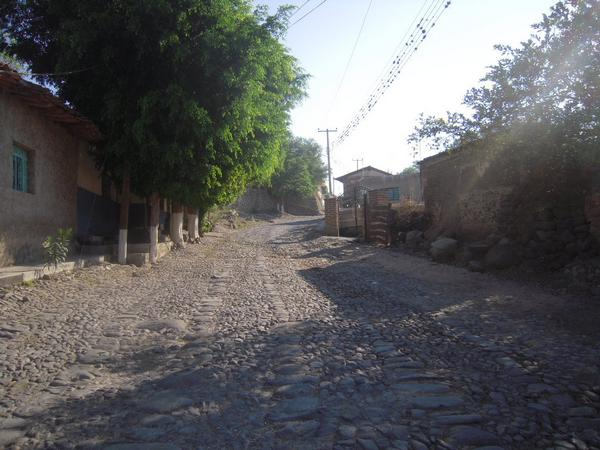
The rock-paved streets
