= Randy Santana =

Mexican footballer (born 1983)

Personal information
- Full name: Randy Scott Santana Hernández
- Date of birth: January 1, 1983 (age 43)
- Place of birth: Tomatlán, Jalisco, Mexico
- Height: 1.80 m (5 ft 11 in)
- Position: Defender

Senior career*
Years	Team	Apps	(Gls)
2004–2009	Tecos UAG	29	(1)
2006–2008	Tecos UAG 'A'	51	(2)
2010	Guerreros de Hermosillo	9	(0)
- * Club domestic league appearances and goals as of November 27, 2008

Randy Scott Santana Hernández (born 1 January 1983) is a Mexican former professional footballer who played as a defender. He debuted in the Primera División on 13 November 2004 in a 2–2 draw with Chivas de Guadalajara.
