= Barranca de Otates =

Coordinates: 20°16′N 103°40′W

Barranca de Otates Barranca de Otatán
- Interactive map of Barranca de Otates
- Country: Mexico
- State: Jalisco
- Municipality: Zacoalco de Torres
- Elevation: 1,480 m (4,860 ft)

Population (2020)
  - Total: 1,001
- Time zone: UTC-6 (Central Standard Time)
  - Summer (DST): UTC-5 (Central Daylight Time)

Barranca de Otates or Barranca de los Otates is a pueblo in Mexico. Its municipality is Zacoalco de Torres in Jalisco. The population was 1,001 according to the 2020 census.

== History ==
The town long ago was filled with otates (Mexican weeping bamboo) that grew all along the canyon near the river that flows through the town. The plant was used to make baskets of different sizes and are very sturdy and durable. The plant sometimes can also be made into a cane or walking stick by using the roots for the handle; when made it sometimes resembles an animal with two horns or ears.

== Terrain ==
The town has many beautiful sights. It is built around a seasonal stream that flows mostly during the rainy season (June to September). Up the canyon there are Las Peñas ("Boulders"). There are beautiful rock formations on each side of the stream which seem to be granite. At the top of the stream is an area that has an enclosed canyon called El Cajón. This is a waterfall over 7 metres (23 ft) high. The site is between three mountains and there is only one watercourse.

Most of the residents own horses and most of them are middle-class people. People around Barranca de Otates own land and grow crops there. The most important crops are maize, sorghum, beans and agave.

== Location ==
The town is located in southern Jalisco, about one hour south of Guadalajara. There are a few nearby towns, including Barranca de Santa Clara, Barranca de los Laureles and Pueblo Nuevo.

== Religion ==
The populace is predominantly Roman Catholic and there are two Catholic churches in town. The annual celebrations of the Holy Cross (the patron saint of the town) and the sanctuary of the Virgin of Guadalupe are held on May 3 and 12 December.
