= Cabo Corrientes Municipality =

Cabo Corrientes
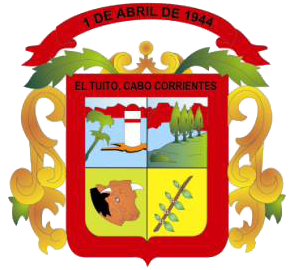
- Coat of arms

- Location in Jalisco

- Location in Mexico
- Coordinates: 20.392545°N 105.420259°W
- Country: Mexico
- State: Jalisco
- Municipality: Cabo Corrientes
- Established: 18 March 1944

Government
  - Municipal president: Miguel Ángel Silva Ramírez (PVEM)

Area
  - Total: 2,001.06 km^{2} (772.61 sq mi)

Population (2015)
  - Total: 10,303
  - Density: 5.1488/km^{2} (13.335/sq mi)
- Time zone: UTC-6 (Central Standard Time)

Cabo Corrientes is a municipality in the state of Jalisco, Mexico, being the westernmost municipality in Jalisco. It is named after the cape of the same name, Cabo Corrientes. The municipal seat is a town named El Tuito.

== History ==
Before the arrival of the Spaniards the region was already populated by Nahua people.

By March 1525, the peninsula had submitted to the Spanish province of Xalisco. When the Spanish troops went down to the sea, a large aboriginal army arrived. They were armed with bows, clubs, throwing darts, and each one wore a banderilla with multicolored feathers in his hand and on his face. They were so numerous that Captain Francisco Cortés de San Buenaventura proposed to avoid fighting, since he calculated that each Spaniard would have to confront a thousand Aborigines; however one of his captains, Angel de Villafana, persuaded him to fight, under four royal banners and others of crimson and apricot On one side the cross and on the other the image of the Purísima.

The struggle was about to begin, but when the banners were uncovered the Virgin appeared bright and glittering. The Indians were amazed by that portent. Instead of attacking they gathered together, dragged their flags, and placed them at the foot of the holy and old priest Juan de Villa Diego, bearer of the banner, and surrendered their arms before Cortés, declared themselves his vassals and celebrated with songs, dances, and the sound of boleros and atabales. In memory of this event the place is called the "Valle de Banderas".

In November 1847 the indigenous people raised a large army when they heard news of the American invasion. With the rallying cry of "Long live the Virgin of Guadalajara!" they rebelled against the government. In this place, Antonio Rojas raised an army of 2,000 indigenous people who fought against the conservative chief Francisco Tovar.

In 1872, Porfirio Díaz took refuge in these lands.

From 1825 to 1890 the region belonged to the 6th canton of Autlan, later to the 10th canton of Mascota. On 1 April 1944, by decree number 4955, it was elevated to category of municipality with the name it takes today. Before that it was called El Tuito (Jalisco) and in 1843 was called San Pedro El Tuito (Jalisco).

== Geography ==
=== Land ===
Cabo Corrientes is in the west of the state, on the Pacific Ocean. Elevations range from sea level to 1,085 metres (3,560 ft). The Bahía de Banderas is to the north, Puerto Vallarta to the northeast, Talpa de Allende to the east, Tomatlán to the south, and the Pacific Ocean to the west.

Seventy percent of the municipality is rugged, with hills from 800 to 1,800 metres (2,600 to 5,900 ft) above sea level, but lower down the land is flatter.

The rocks were formed in the Triassic and Jurassic. Soils are mostly Eutric Regosol or Feozem Háplico, with Luvisol and Litosol in some areas.

The municipality covers 200,106 hectares (494,470 acres), of which 7,009 hectares (17,320 acres) are used for agriculture, 36,500 hectares (90,000 acres) for livestock, 146,770 hectares (362,700 acres) for forest, 293 hectares (720 acres) urban land and 9,534 hectares (23,560 acres) other uses.

=== Hydrology ===
The municipality is in the Central Pacific basin and the Ameca-Tomatlán-Cuale River sub-basin. Its hydrological resources are provided by the rivers Las Juntas, El Tuito (Jalisco), Horcones and Tecolotlán. Streams are Ipaña, La Boquita, Puchiteca, Tabo Pilero, Maxeque and La Peñita. There are thermal springs including Los Carrizalillos. In addition are the estuaries of Maito, La Boquita and Tecolotlán.

=== Climate ===
The climate, in the western coastal, is semi dry, with dry winter and spring, and warm without marked changes in temperature. In the east, it is humid, with dry winter and spring, and warm, with no defined winter season. The average annual temperature is 25.6 °C (78.1 °F) with a maximum of 28.5 °C (83.3 °F) and minimum of 22.7 °C (72.9 °F). Most rainfall is in June, July, August and September, with average precipitation of 878.3 millimetres (34.58 in). The dominant winds are in the northwest direction.

== Government ==
=== Municipal presidents ===
Municipal president	Term	Political party	Notes
Alfonso C. García	1944	PRM	
Braulio Quintero	1945–1946	PRM	
Salvador Ahumada	1947	PRI	
Efrén Castillón	1947–1948	PRI	
Alfonso C. García	1949–1952	PRI	
Abel Castillón Ríos	01-01-1953–31-12-1955	PRI	
Rodamiro González Ríos	01-01-1956–31-12-1958	PRI	
Héctor Rangel Roblés Castillón	01-01-1959–31-12-1961	PRI	
N/A	01-01-1962–31-12-1964		
N/A	01-01-1965–31-12-1967		
Juan Guerra Arrizon	01-01-1968–31-12-1970	PRI	
Roberto Ávalos Castillón	01-01-1971–31-12-1973	PRI	
Antonio Zepeda Pacheco	01-01-1974–1975	PRI	
Juan Rodríguez Aguirre	1975–31-12-1976	PRI	Acting municipal president
Elías García Palacios	01-01-1977–31-12-1979	PRI	
Flavio García Bravo	01-01-1980–31-12-1982	PRI	
Darío Romero León	01-01-1983–31-12-1985	PRI	
Francisco Estrada Rodríguez	01-01-1986–1987	PRI	
Ricardo Hernández Servín	1987–31-12-1988	PRI	Acting municipal president
Óscar Castillón Romero	01-01-1989–1992	PRI	
Miguel Valdés Rodríguez	1992–1995	PRI	
Gonzalo Millán Curiel Alcaraz	1995–1997	PRI	
Alfredo Antuna Márquez	01-01-1998–31-12-2000	PT	
Juan García Michel	01-01-2001–31-12-2003	PAN	
Macedonio León Rodríguez	01-01-2004–31-12-2006	PAN	
Carlos Alberto Orozco Madrigal	01-01-2007–31-12-2009	PRI	
Óscar Castillón Romero	01-01-2010–30-09-2012	PRI; Panal	Alliance for Jalisco
Homero Romero Almaral	01-10-2012–30-09-2015	PRI; PVEM	Coalition "Compromise for Jalisco"
Prisciliano Ramírez Gordián	01-10-2015–2018	PRI	Applied for a temporary leave, to run for reelection, which he got
Manuel Gómez García	2018–30-09-2018	PRI	Acting municipal president
Prisciliano Ramírez Gordián	01-10-2018–30-09-2021	PRI	Was reelected on 01-07-2018
Miguel Ángel Silva Ramírez	01-10-2021–	PVEM	
