= Santa Fe del Río =

- Location within Michoacán Location within Mexico
- Country: Mexico
- State: Michoacán
- Municipality: Penjamillo
- Time zone: UTC-6 (Zona Centro)
- Postal code: 59480

Santa Fe del Río is located in the municipality of Penjamillo in the Mexican state of Michoacán.

The location's median height over sea level is 1680 meters. It is situated alongside the Lerma River.

The town of Santa Fe del Río is located at 15.7 kilometers from Penjamillo de Degollado, which is the most populated locality in the municipality, in the southeast direction. The postal code of Santa Fe del Río is 59480.
