= El Tuito =

Town in Jalisco, Mexico

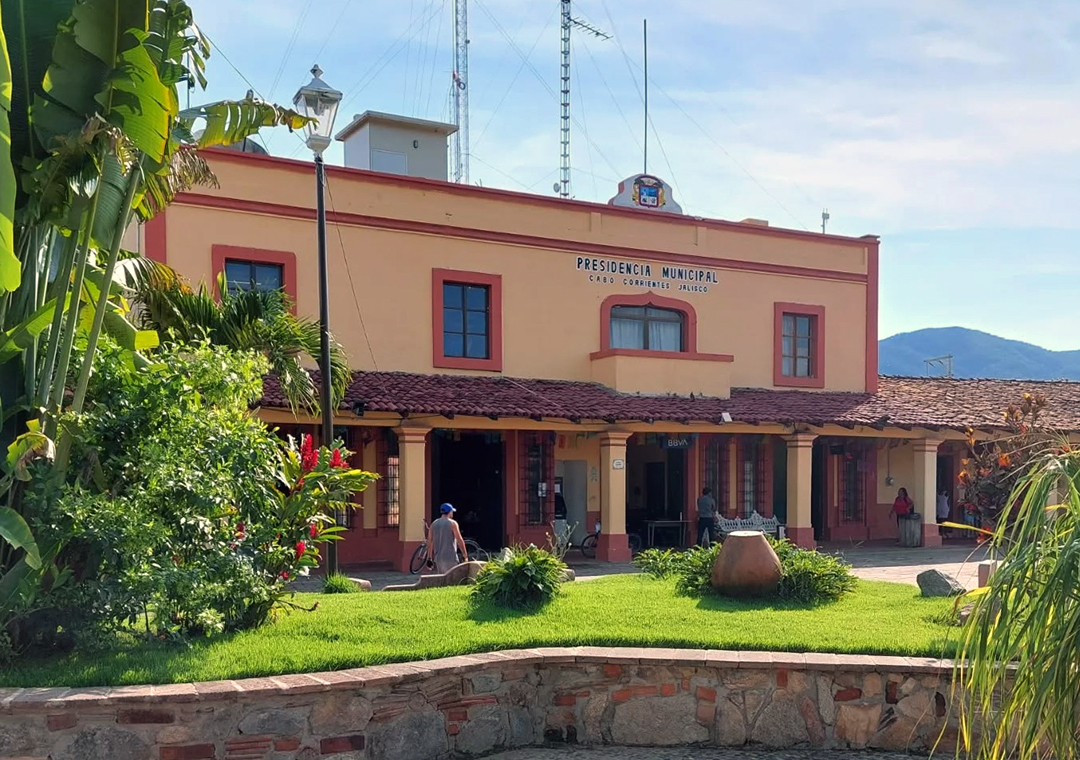
- Cabo Corrientes Municipal Palace

- Location of the municipality of Cabo Corrientes within the state of Jalisco

- Location within Mexico Location within Jalisco
- Coordinates: 20°19′11″N 105°19′38″W
- Country: Mexico
- State: Jalisco
- Municipality: Cabo Corrientes
- Founded: 16th century
- Founded as: El Tuito

Government
  - Municipal president of Cabo Corrientes: Miguel Ángel Silva Ramírez (PVEM)
- Elevation: 600 m (1,969 ft)

Population (2020)
  - Total: 3,835
  - Demonym: Tuitense
- Time zone: UTC−6 (Central (US Central))
- Postal code: 48400
- Area code: +52 322
- Website: Cabo Corrientes Municipality official government site

El Tuito Spanish pronunciation: [el twito] is a Mexican agricultural town situated South of the Pacific Ocean's Bahía de Banderas in the Region Costa-Sierra Occidental of the Mexican state of Jalisco. It is the administrative and municipal seat of the municipality of Cabo Corrientes.

El Tuito name means "small valley" or "place of beauty". The meaning of the word Tuito comes from the Nahuatl words "Teotl": god, Tiul, Tuitlán: which can mean: "place of [a] god" or "divine place" or "place of beauty".

== History ==
It was founded in the 16th century by Spanish and Portuguese settlers, accompanied by a Tlaxcaltecan population that introduced the Nahuatl language to the region. Before the Conquest, the territory was populated by Huicholes, Coras, and Tecuexes.

By March 1525 the conquerors, led by Francisco Cortés de San Buenaventura, had already occupied Xalisco. But when they went down to the sea, encountered a group of indigenous people armed with clubs, bows and arrows, and darts, and each one carried a flag made of feathers of many colors. As the Nahuas were outnumbered, Captain Francisco Cortés refused to fight against the locals, but one of the captains who accompanied him, Ángel de Villafaña, told him that they should face them and fight against them so they stuck into the ground four royal banners, and two of crimson color, and also a woven damask with the image of the Virgin Mary on one side and a cross on the other.

When the Nahuas observed the banner of the Virgin, instead of attacking them they refused, since for them that image was very important and venerated by the entire tribe, so they thought that the Spaniards were people sent by their god, then they all got together to then drag their flags and place them at the feet of Juan de Villadiego, who was the one who carried the banner, and at the feet of Francisco Cortés they dropped all their weapons showing him that they would not fight. After this, the aborigines received them and housed them in their town, accompanied them with music, dances, etcetera, and through this event the place where all this took place was named Valle de Banderas ("Valley of Flags" or "Valley of Banners").

In the period from 1825 to 1890 this town was part of the sixth canton of Autlán and later it was part of the tenth canton of Mascota.

In 1843 it was given the name of San Pedro del Tuito, and on 14 March 1844, by decree of the Congress of the State of Jalisco, El Tuito was designated as a delegation belonging to Cabo Corrientes.

In El Tuito, the inhabitants celebrate its foundation on 1 April of each year.

=== Timeline ===
- 1525 On 8 April, Captain Francisco Cortés de San Buenaventura achieved the conquest of the El Tuito area.
- 1857 Don Pablo Ríos took up arms against the conservatives in the Reform War that lasted three years for the Reform Laws. He raised in arms the people of the region of El Tuito, Tomatlán, Mascota, and Talpa. D. Pablo was invested by General Ramón Corona as the Regional Military Chief of the Jalisco Coast. He fought in the region of El Tuito, Tomatlán, Talpa, Mascota, and Tepic. He succeeded in most of the battles in which he participated. He came to have a contingent at his command of a force of more than 2,000 armed men and on horseback. He was a recognized liberal.

In 1858 he received at his house Don Benito Juárez, who had been fleeing from Guadalajara after suffering an attack. He was in El Tuito for a short time and then left for Colima. Later he continued to Louisiana, in the U.S.

Since 1867, he persecuted and fought Manuel Lozada "The Tiger of Alica", a Nayarit chieftain, with monarchical and agrarian ideas (supported by the clergy), who had risen up against the federal government (liberal) and protected by the Emperor Maximilian.

In 1871 Lozada's group was defeated at the “La Mojonera” Ranch, managing to save the “Pueblo de Tequila” from their invasion and a possible planned attack on the city of Guadalajara, capturing them and later shooting their leader in 1873, by the forces of Ramón Corona (commanded by the above-mentioned Pablo Ríos), but some criminals were fugitive and continued to do misdeeds.

In 1876, Don Pablo Ríos was killed in an ambush, during a surveillance trip, in the north of Jalisco, by a group of French fugitives and several Mexican and indigenous conservative renegades who had been led by Manuel Lozada, the aforementioned Nayarit chieftain, and who were assaulting and robbing an extensive territory of Jalisco, Nayarit, and Sinaloa, since shortly after the French intervention ended in 1867.

Don Pablo defended and helped the entire region, which is why the towns of Tomatlán and El Tuito consider him their hero and remember him with gratitude for everything he did for them. For that reason, what is the Main Street of El Tuito, bears his name.

- 1871 The El Tuito locality became a part of the Talpa district.
- 1872 General Porfirio Díaz remained hidden in different parts of the municipality by taking up arms against the government of Benito Juárez when he was going to Mazatlán.
- 1905 El Tuito became a locality of the municipality of Tomatlán.
- 1924 El Tuito became part of the municipality of Puerto Vallarta.
- 1944 On 18 March, by decree number 4955, the El Tuito delegation was established as a municipality with the name of Cabo Corrientes.

== Geography ==
=== Climate ===
The climate in the El Tuito region is temperate with dry and warm springs and no defined winter season. This municipality has a very pleasant climate since its average annual temperature is 78 °F (25.6 °C); prevailing winds are towards the northwest, and the rainy season last from June to September giving approximately an average annual rainfall of 878.3 millimeters.

=== Flora and fauna ===
==== Flora ====
Its flora is made up of several varieties of fruit trees such as the following, mango, lime, lemon, orange, guava, avocado and other varieties of vegetation such as cedars, pines, oaks, walnut trees, breadnuts, conifers, gum tree, and Santa Maria tree.

==== Fauna ====
This region has a varied fauna and the animals that make it up are deer, snakes, scorpions, raccoons, bats, badgers, squirrels, pigeons, parakeets, foxes, opossums, armadillos.

Various species of marine animals of interest are present on the coast of Cabo Corrientes. Five species of sea turtles stand out, four of them nest on its sandy beaches: olive ridley, green sea turtle, leatherback sea turtle, and hawksbill sea turtle. Also, specimens of the loggerhead sea turtle species feed in juvenile state in the marine zone. The presence of whales, dolphins, and killer whales (orcas) that can be seen on tours of the area is common. The southern end of the municipality's coast is part of the Playón de Mismaloya Sanctuary Natural Protected Area, the largest space in Mexico for the protection of sea turtles.

In the terrestrial zone, the presence of practically all the felines of Mexico stands out, especially jaguars and pumas, which are persecuted by poachers without there being an institutional program for their protection. No appropriate inventories or studies have been carried out, despite the fact that it is recognized as one of the richest territories in biodiversity and with a relatively good degree of conservation.

=== Hydrography ===
El Tuito forms an internal part of the Central Pacific basin, Ameca-Tomatlán, Tomatlán-Río Cuale sub-basin, the main streams being the rivers: “La Puerta”, “Zicatán”, “Tecolotlán”. The seasonal streams are: "El Ipala" and "La Boquita"; the permanent streams are: “Puchiteca”, “Tabo Piloro”, “Maxeque” and “La Peñita”. El Tuito has many springs and estuaries such as: "Mayto", "La Boquita" and "Tecolotlán".

=== Topography ===
Its surface is composed of three-quarters of elevated areas with heights approximately 2625 to 5900 feet (800 to 1800 meters) above sea level. The other quarter is made up of areas formed by hills and tors that are not very high, between 0 and 1300 feet (0 and 400 meters) asl.

=== Soil ===
This territory is made up of territories of predominant composition of soils, these types of soil are: Eutric Regosol, Haplic Feozem, and Leptosol.

Eutric regosol: it is clear, it is of a rocky origin identical to its species and has a thickness of a single layer.

Haplic feozem: this is a soil of any climate but it is more in the rainy climate.

Leptosol: this is soft and in some of the areas it shows a dark surface.

== Economy ==
The main economic activities that stand out in El Tuito are: agriculture, livestock, industry, forestry, fishing, and tourism

- Within agriculture those that stand out the most are: sorghum, corn, sesame, and coffee.
- In livestock the rearing of: cattle, pigs, goats, horses and different types of birds stand out.
- Currently there are small industries in the municipal seat. The main branches are the conversion of food, dairy products, pastures, tequila, raicilla distillers. Also, there are small businesses which process coffee (toasting and grinding).
- Forest exploitation. There is forestry activity with non-timber products and these refer to the exploitation of chilte to manufacture chewing gum, and almonds from oil coquito.
- Fishing in the municipality is carried out through the exploitation of different species of oyster, crab, and fish, in the sale of these stands out El Tuito.
- Within the tourism in the municipality of Cabo Corrientes, tourists can visit the forests located South of this municipal seat El Tuito.

Forest exploitation. According to data revealed by the National Institute of Statistics and Geography (INEGI), compiled out of an Agricultural Census, Cabo Corrientes is, on a state level, the main forest producer with the highest volume of wood extracted in Jalisco.

Sightseeing. There is no official directory or formal program to promote tourism service providers in the municipality of Cabo Corrientes. In the Villa del Mar area, stayings can be made to participate in sea turtle conservation activities, in support of the University of Guadalajara and a Community Environmental Surveillance Committee, as part of the offer of true ecotourism.

== Points of interest ==
El Tuito is the oldest town in the municipality of Cabo Corrientes. The orange and yellow colors of the houses distinguish this town.

Regarding its places of interest, there is the main square, where you can admire the temple garden, surrounded by palm trees and splendid trees, as well as the Maria tree. The ruins of the Ex Hacienda San José are another attraction, dating back to 1875.

== Festivities of El Tuito ==
- January 12: Celebration of the Virgin of Guadalupe. This celebration lasts nine days, during which sporting events, pilgrimages with dance, music, flowers, banners and fireworks are carried out, in the last three days dances are organized and stalls are put on the doorways of the church, and on the last day a Mass is celebrated in honor of the Virgin of Guadalupe.

- April 1: Construction day of the municipal seat of El Tuito.

- May 10: Celebration of Mother's Day.

These feasts are celebrated in the town center square, with music and fireworks.

== Religion ==
The prevailing religion in this region is Roman Catholicism; there is only one assigned priest. Besides, there are those who consider themselves to be Seventh-day Adventists. A few are of the Jewish religion, and others who claim to be non-believers. Lastly, there are a small number of Jehovah's Witnesses.

== Media ==
El Tuito has the following communication media, telephony, fax, telegraphy, mail, and radiotelephony. In 2008, broadband internet service and cell phone were added.

=== Land communication routes ===
Ground transportation is carried out on the Barra de Navidad-Puerto Vallarta Highway (#200); the Guadalajara-Chapalilla (Nayarit) Highway (#15), connecting with the Chapalilla-Compostela Toll Highway (#68-D) and the Compostela-El Tuito Highway (#200). All of the towns of the municipality of Cabo Corrientes are communicated with El Tuito (administrative seat of the municipality of Cabo Corrientes) by means of dirt roads. Interurban passenger transport is carried out in passing buses. There are the Autotransportes Cihuatlán bus lines and Servicios Coordinados lines of the Flecha Amarilla group. There is also a local bus line that covers the route El Tuito-Puerto Vallarta, with service every half hour. The terminals are at the Plaza de Armas (Main Square) of El Tuito, and the corner of Insurgentes and Basilio Vadillo, in the Zona Romántica of Puerto Vallarta.

=== Air transportation ===
Air transportation is carried out through the Puerto Vallarta Airport or through the airway that the municipality of Cabo Corrientes has.

Jaguar

== Projects ==
=== Project-Jaguar ===
This project has been carried out since 2003, in order to protect the jaguar and associated species. With the support of the Secretariat of Environment and Natural Resources (Semarnat–Jalisco), UMA Santa Cruz de El Tuito and Servicios Forestales El Tuito (Technical Manager of UMA) built a 1.1-hectare "Jaguar Refuge" shelter in the mountains with natural vegetation inside. In the shelter a female jaguar called "Pecas" ("Freckles") has been kept, which had been recovered from the hands of a hunter as a puppy in 2003, and by June 2008 she had a cub; both have been kept in the most natural conditions possible. The lodge seeks to carry out ecotourism and educational activities in order to protect jaguar specimens in the region and raise awareness among the population.

== Utilities ==
The municipality of Cabo Corrientes offers its inhabitants a certain variety of services, which are: drinking water and sewerage, public lighting, market, flea market, slaughterhouse, gardens, parks, public security, and sports centers.

Among the most important basic services, the inhabitants who have drinking water obtain a coverage of 53.8%, in sewerage it is 54.7%, the coverage of electric power service is 52.3%.

It has a Centro de Salud (Health Center) in the municipal seat, in addition to Casas de Salud (Health Houses) in some villages, there is access to patent and generic medicines at the pharmacy and perfumery located on Calle 1 de Abril.

== Culture ==
In their culture, one of women's typical costumes is the "ropa de manta", that is, coarse cotton clothes with embroidery; in the town, they produce huaraches and pieces of pottery. Their most outstanding food are some seafood and Mexican snacks; the corundas (a kind of tamale), and finally the typical sweets are the coconut atole, the "payos", and the "chiltes" (sweets made out of naseberry sap).
