= Pajacuarán Municipality =

Pajacuarán
- Municipality
- Location in Mexico
- Coordinates: 20°7′5″N 102°33′54″W
- Country: Mexico
- State: Michoacán
- Municipal seat: Pajacuarán
- Established: 12 February 1942

Area
  - Total: 174.06 km^{2} (67.20 sq mi)

Population (2010)
  - Total: 19,450
  - Density: 111.7/km^{2} (289.4/sq mi)

Pajacuarán is one of the 113 municipalities of Michoacán, in central Mexico. The municipal seat lies at the town of the same name.

== Localities ==
The main towns and their population are the following:

Locality	Population
Total	19,450
Pajacuarán	9,766
La Luz	3,689
San Gregorio	2,384
