= Pajacuarán =

- Town
- Location in Mexico
- Coordinates: 20°7′4″N 102°34′0″W
- Country: Mexico
- State: Michoacán
- Municipality: Pajacuarán

Population (2010)
  - Total: 10,014

Pajacuarán is a town and seat of the municipality of Pajacuarán, in the central Mexican state of Michoacán. As of 2010, the town had a population of 10,014. In 2015, the population of Michoacán Pajacuarán was around 21,028. Pajacuaran has a large and long standing church named San Cristóbal named after St. Christopher
