= Los Limones =

- Community
- Location within the Dominican Republic
- Coordinates: 19°46′0″N 71°19′0″W
- Country: Dominican Republic
- Province: María Trinidad Sánchez Province
- Municipality: El Pozo

Los Limones is a small community in the north east part of María Trinidad Sánchez Province, Dominican Republic. It is located in the El Pozo municipal district. It is an important place in the Nagua valley. The demographic makeup of the place includes those who work in the rice plantations, which provides a sustainable economic prosperity.

The story behind the name of the community probably dates to before the locality was colonized. The story tells of the peasants who worked the rice fields and had to travel the distance by foot; they would stop to rest at the lemon trees close to the entry area of the community, on their way to and from work, giving rise to the name.

== Points of interest ==
- Parroquia Nuestra Senora Del Rosario – the church serves as a hub for Catholic religious events.
- Play De Baseball Los Limones – the hub for all sporting events, located centrally in the community.
- D 'Lemon Bar – a large community center close to the rice fields with indoor and outdoor gathering areas, also used for events such as graduation ceremonies and parties.
- Centro Cervecero KJS – A recreation center for adults located close to the entrance of the community, it has long been recognized as a point of reference.
- Club Salome Urena – The local community club, it has been long neglected. It was used for social events in the past but serves as a center for union meetings. In addition, it also has a basketball court on premises.

== Religion ==
Catholicism and Protestantism are the two major denominations within the community, with Catholicism being larger and also the official religion. Protestantism has started gaining acceptance among the local populace with the increase evangelical religious leaders and the construction of various religious buildings.

== Notable people ==
- Viviana Mercedez – She was a local community activist and has contributed significantly to the municipality and was also instrumental in forming the local parish. She died in 2007.
