= La Luz, Michoacán =

La Luz
- City
- Location in Mexico
- Coordinates: 20°8′54″N 102°38′6″W
- Country: Mexico
- State: Michoacán
- Municipality: Pajacuarán

Population (2010)
  - Total: 3,689

La Luz is a town in the municipality of Pajacuarán, in the central Mexican state of Michoacán. As of 2010, the town had a population of 3,689.
