= Tlachichila =

- Town
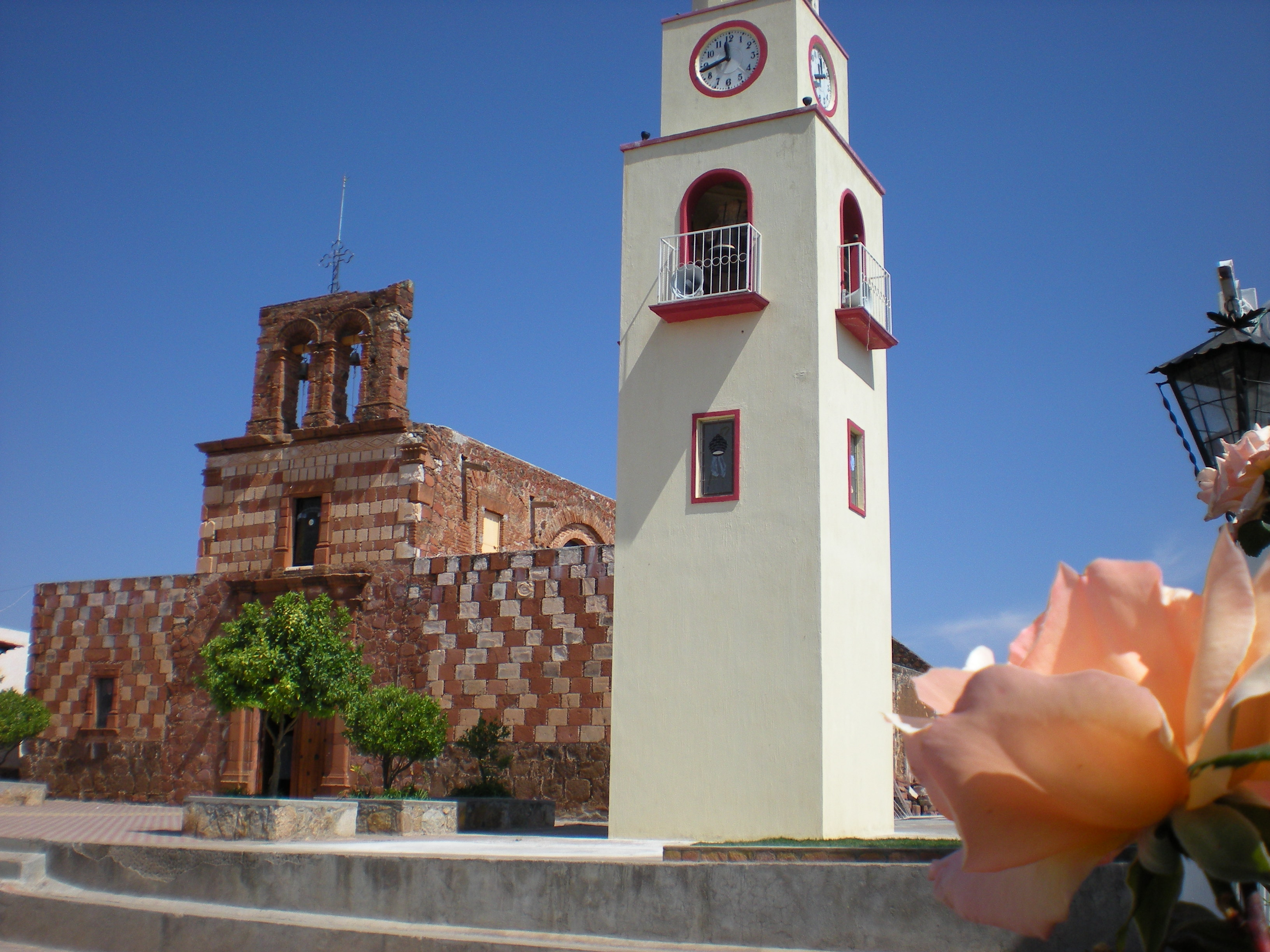
- Saint Augustinus Catholic Church
- Nickname: Tlachis
- Location within Zacatecas Location within Mexico
- Coordinates: 21°33′30″N 102°47′00″W
- Country: Mexico
- State: Zacatecas
- Municipality: Nochistlán de Mejía
- Elevation: 2,198 m (7,211 ft)

Population
  - Total: 1,336
- Time zone: UTC−6 (Zona Centro)
- Postal code: 99918
- Area code: 346-787
- Website: www.tlachichila.com

Tlachichila (Spanish pronunciation: [tɬatʃiˈtʃila]) is a small town in the Mexican state of Zacatecas located in the municipality of Nochistlán de Mejía with an approximate population of 1,300. It derives its name from the Nahuatl terms tlalli (earth) and chichiltic (red) for the red soil found in the region. Tlachichila lies on Mexican Federal Highway 131.

== History ==
Tlachichila was founded as a hacienda in 1711 in the center of several farming communities within the municipality of Nochistlán de Mejia. Construction of a Catholic church in the town's center began in 1875 under the Archbishop of Guadalajara, Pedro José de Jesús Loza y Pardavé. The church's construction ended in 1901, though the parish was not formally established until January 25, 1922, with Augustine of Hippo as its patron saint.

Over the course of the 20th century, the original hacienda was parceled and sold off to local farmers and business owners. The division of land led to the structuring and subsequent urbanization of Tlachichila, allowing it to function as town center for the smaller outlying farming communities in the region.
