= Betania, Jalisco =

Betania
- town
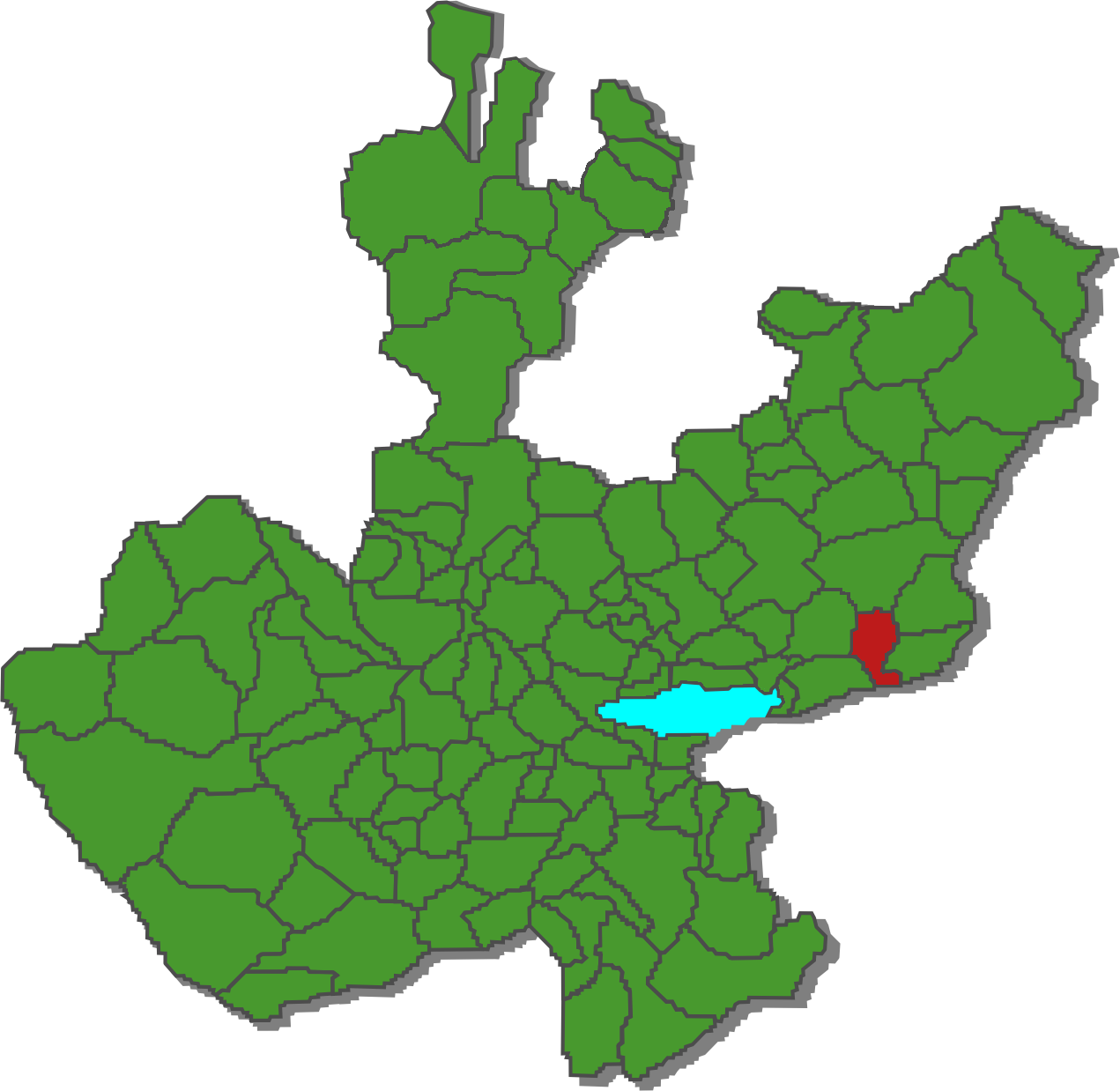
- Location of the municipality in Jalisco

- Location in Mexico
- Coordinates: 20°20′N 102°15′W
- Country: Mexico
- State: Jalisco
- Municipality: Ayotlán
- Elevation: 1,930 m (6,330 ft)

Population (2020)
  - Total: 2,690

Betania is a town in Ayotlán Municipality, in Jalisco in central-western Mexico. The population was 2,690 according to the 2020 census. The 2005 census had recorded a population of 2,849 inhabitants.

== Place Names ==
The city is named after the Palestinian city of Bethany now known as al-Eizariya, with the name originating from the Aramaic and Hebrew word Beth anya (בית עניא), meaning "house of the figs"; the literal translation of the Spanish name Betania.
