= Tecomatán =

Human settlement in Mexico

Coordinates: 20°06′N 102°29′W

Tecomatan is a small town in the Mexican state of Michoacán. It is not very well known nationally, but the town is well known in its surrounding regions.

According to a census conducted in 2020, the town's population was 1,055 people, with a population density of 1,794/km^{2}. Its literacy rate is 84.6% and the majority, 1,022 are Roman Catholic.

Tecomatan is located on the foothill of a green mountain with a cross sitting on its very top. There is a wide variety of plants and trees and there are many farmers that grow vegetables, fruits and agave plants that are used to produce tequila.

There are taco stands, bars, enchiladas, and traditional Mexican food. Vendors from all over Mexico come and sell their products that range from Mexican breads, wooden spoons and toys, CDs and DVDs, to clothes for all ages and sizes.

== September Festivals ==
Every September the town celebrates el señor de los Milagros. Between the 4th and the 14th every night there is a concert and shops open on the main street in Tecomatan. Natives and their families that have migrated to the United States also visit for the celebrations.People from the surrounding regions and beyond come to these festivals.
