= Zapotiltic =

- Municipality and town
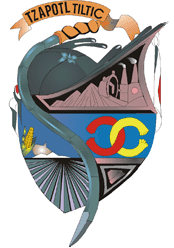
- Coat of arms

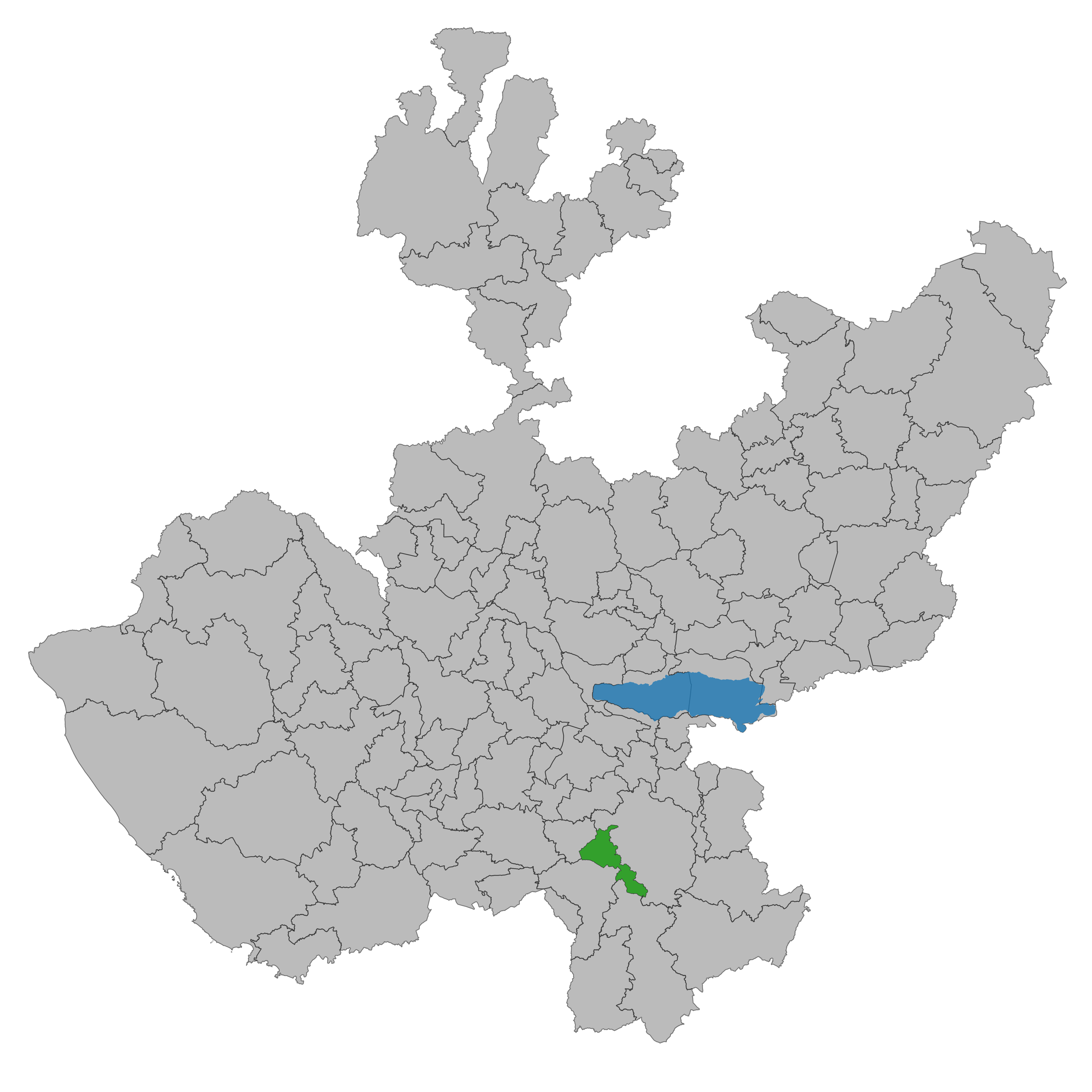
- Location of the municipality in Jalisco

- Location within Mexico
- Coordinates: 19°37′37.27″N 103°25′1.06″W
- Country: Mexico
- State: Jalisco
- Municipio: Zapotiltic

Government
  - Mayor: Jorge Silva

Area
  - Municipality: 252.3 km^{2} (97.4 sq mi)
  - Town: 7.15 km^{2} (2.76 sq mi)
- Elevation: 1,302 m (4,272 ft)

Population (2020 census)
  - Municipality: 33,713
  - Density: 133.6/km^{2} (346.1/sq mi)
  - Town: 27,260
  - Town density: 3,810/km^{2} (9,870/sq mi)
- Website: www.zapotiltic.gob.mx
- INEGI code 121

Zapotiltic is a town and municipality in the south region of the state of Jalisco, Mexico. It is located approximately 115 km south of Guadalajara. According to the "Conteo de Poblacion y Vivienda of 2015" the municipality had a population of 29,190.

== Toponymy ==
The name Zapotiltic comes from the Náhuatl words Tzápotl ('zapote') and tlíitic ('black'), meaning 'place of the black zapotes'. This name was adopted due to the abundance of this fruit in the area in the past.

== Government ==
The form of government is democratic and depends on the Jalisco state government and the federal government. Elections are held every three years, when the municipal president and her/his council are elected. The incumbent municipal president is Jorge Silva, a member of the Hagamos political party. They were elected in the election of 2 June 2024.

In 1936, the Municipal Palace was taken amidst shootings, blood, and fire, by command of the State Government; since the outgoing municipal president, Cayetano Vega, refused to hand over power. In addition to members of the Army, the following people participated: Julio Lares Rodríguez, president-elect; Serafín González, Maximiano Llamas, Fortunato Lares, and Aurelio Reyes, among others.

The municipality has 38 towns, the most important are: Zapotiltic (municipal seat), Arco de Cobianes (El Coahuayote), El Rincón, Tasinaxtla (La Cañada), Aserradero, Huescalapa, Villa Lázaro Cárdenas (Aserradero).

=== Municipal presidents ===
Municipal president	Term	Political party	Notes
Aniceto Ceballos Manríquez	1912		
José María Sánchez	1915		
Francisco Ceballos Sánchez	1920		
Magdaleno Torres	1921		
Daniel Serrano García	1923–1924		
Alberto Chávez	1925		
Emeterio Núñez	1926		
David Ceballos Campos	1928		
Daniel Vargas Cuevas	1929		
Tomás C. Salgado	1929	PNR	
Lucio Sánchez Sánchez	1930	PNR	
Benito Torres Milanés	1931	PNR	
Daniel Gutiérrez González	1933	PNR	
Cayetano Vega	1936	PNR	
Julio Lares Rodríguez	1936	PNR	
Maximiano Llamas González	1937–1938	PNR	
Trinidad Alvarado Tirado	1939	PRM	
Francisco Montañez García	1940	PRM	
José Cárdenas Ceballos	1941	PRM	
Maximiano Llamas González	1942	PRM	
Manuel Cárdenas Zepeda	1943	PRM	
Martín Juárez Gómez	1944	PRM	
Maximiano Llamas González	1945–1946	PRM	
Roberto Sánchez García	1947	PRI	
Rodolfo Gutiérrez García	1948	PRI	
José Vega Villanueva	1949	PRI	
Juan Ceballos Larios	1950–1951	PRI	
J. Isaac Mendoza Villalvazo	1952	PRI	
José Mendoza Cortés	1953–1955	PRI	
N/A	1956–1973		
Alfredo Sánchez Vargas	1974–1976	PRI	
Salvador Farías Sánchez	1977–1979	PRI	
José Lares Casillas	1980–1982	PRI	
Santiago Moreno C.	1982	PRI	
Antonio Vega Cortés	01-01-1983–31-12-1985	PRI	
Adolfo Ceja García	01-01-1986–31-12-1988	PRI	
Fernando Cárdenas Tirado	1989–1992	PRI	
Roberto Flores Ramos	1992–1995	PRI	
Jorge Galván Montaño	1995–1997	PAN	
José Agustín Saavedra Iglesias	01-01-1998–31-12-2000	PRI	
Fernando Ceballos Sánchez	01-01-2001–31-12-2003	PRI	
Raúl Sánchez Sánchez	01-01-2004–31-12-2006	PRD	
Jesús Roberto Campos Fernández	01-01-2007–31-12-2009	PAN	
Federico Sánchez Pérez	01-01-2010–30-09-2012	PAN	
Ramiro Jr Farías Martínez	01-10-2012–30-09-2015	PRI; PVEM	Coalition "Compromise for Jalisco"
René Santiago Macías	01-10-2015–30-09-2018	PAN; PRD	
Francisco Gerardo Sedano Vizcaíno	01-10-2018–05-03-2021	PAN	Applied for a temporary leave to run for reelection
Argelia Ochoa Rodríguez	06-03-2021–2021	PAN	Acting municipal president
Francisco Gerardo Sedano Vizcaíno	01-10-2021–??-03-2024	PAN	Was reelected on 06/06/2021
Fernando Cárdenas Montaño	??-03-2024–30-09-2024	PAN	Acting municipal president
Jorge Irineo Silva Sánchez	01-10-2024–	Hagamos; PVEM; PT; Morena; Futuro	Coalition "Sigamos Haciendo Historia" (Let's Keep Making History in Jalisco)
