= Matatlán =

Matatlàn
- Town
- Motto: Pueblo de Fé
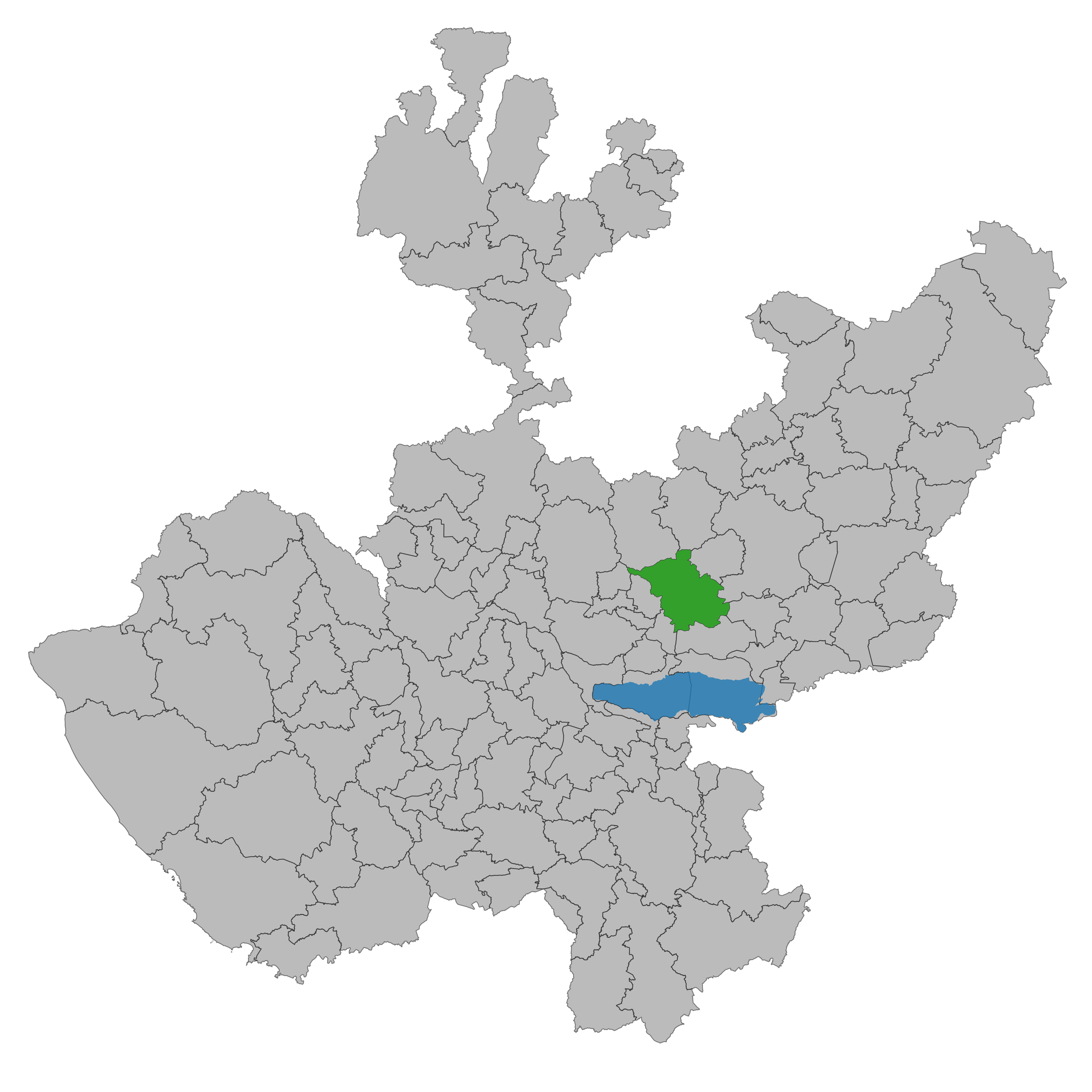
- Location of the municipality in Jalisco

- Location within Mexico
- Coordinates: 20°42′36″N 103°9′0″W
- Country: Mexico
- State: Jalisco
- Municipality: Zapotlanejo
- Town: Matatlàn
- Earliest Documented: 1537

Population (2016)
  - Total: 2,000
- Time zone: UTC-6 (Central (US Central))
  - Summer (DST): UTC-5 (Central (US Central))
- Postal code: 45435

Matatlàn is a town in the municipality of Zapotlanejo in the Mexican state of Jalisco.

According to the 2015 census, there were 2,000 inhabitants in the town.

== Toponymy ==
Matatlán is a hybrid word, half of unknown origin and half Nahuatl. In the earliest written record it is written as el peñole Nochislán y pueblo, el Pueblo de Matatan or Matastán. According to local folk etymology it is composed of "mata" (from Nahuatl net) and "tlán" (from Nahuatl place): the place of net fishing from its location near the Rio Verde.

== Climate ==
Climate data for Matatlàn
Month	Jan	Feb	Mar	Apr	May	Jun	Jul	Aug	Sep	Oct	Nov	Dec	Year
Mean daily maximum °C (°F)	26 (79)	28.0 (82.4)	30.3 (86.5)	33 (91)	34.0 (93.2)	31.3 (88.3)	28.4 (83.1)	28.2 (82.8)	28 (82)	27.7 (81.9)	27.5 (81.5)	26.2 (79.2)	29.0 (84.2)
Mean daily minimum °C (°F)	6.6 (43.9)	7.6 (45.7)	9.0 (48.2)	11.3 (52.3)	14 (57)	16 (61)	15.5 (59.9)	15.3 (59.5)	14.9 (58.8)	12.3 (54.1)	9 (48)	7.3 (45.1)	11.6 (52.9)
Average precipitation mm (inches)	15 (0.6)	5.1 (0.2)	5.1 (0.2)	5.1 (0.2)	25 (1)	170 (6.7)	220 (8.8)	220 (8.6)	150 (5.8)	43 (1.7)	7.6 (0.3)	5.1 (0.2)	870 (34.4)
Source: Weatherbase

== History ==
The town of Matatlán was settled by pre-Hispanic inhabitants, the Tecuexes, who established themselves in the area about 1218. Nuño de Guzmán writes that there were more than 1,000 people (men, women and children) in the area upon his first exploration of the region on Friday 26 of February 1526.

Spanish settlement in the area began around 1523 and the town has been inhabited since that time. The early agricultural products of the area were wheat and piloncillo made from cane sugar around the ruins of the Hacienda de Colimilla which can be found five kilometers to the east of the town.
