= El Fresno, Michoacán =

Coordinates: 19°59′40″N 102°48′09″W

El Fresno Municipio de Jiquilpan Michoacán El Fresno
- Nickname: SN
- Interactive map of El Fresno Municipio de Jiquilpan Michoacán
- Country: Mexico
- State: Michoacán
- Foundation: 1898

Government
  - Type: Municipality
- Elevation: 1,960 m (6,430 ft)
- Time zone: CST UTC-6
  - Summer (DST): CDT UTC-5
- Postal Code: 59526
- Area code: +52 (Mexico) / +353 (Jiquilpan)

The small town of El Fresno is located in the northwest of Jiquilpan, Mexican State of Michoacán de Ocampo and southwest of Sahuayo, De Morelos, Michoacán.

The small town has over 207 inhabitants and is over 1960 meters above sea level.

The town is noticeable because of the milk and cheese. It also has a Pemex gas station and some abarrotes, or small stores. It has a connection between Road #110 to La Piedad and Manzanillo, Colima End Road. In the town overlooking the meadow vegetation with mesquite, cactus and yucca huisache, the mixed forest of pine, oak and cedar, also shrubs of different species. Features and Land Use lesser extent livestock and forestry. It is also known for crops and fields with corn and chickpeas.

El Fresno also has a soccer field, and a large "presa" where people fish.

Panorama of El Fresno

== Nearby cities and towns ==
- Abadiano
- Guadalajara
- Jiquilpan
- Sahuayo
- San José de Gracia
- Manzanillo (Via #110 Route)
- Valle de Juárez
- Cerro San Francisco
- La Jara
- Los Remedios
- Llano Prieto
- La Lagunita
- Paredones
- Paso
- Timbiscato
- La Cantera
- Totolán
- Guadalupe
- El Molino
- San Onofre
- Jaripo
- Las Mesas
- Las Ánimas
- Cuesta
- Brete
- ^Jiquilpan de Juárez
- Santa María
- San Antonio Guaracha
- Los Animas
- San Juanico
- Santa Bárbara
- Maríano Escobedo
- Capadero
- Villamar
- Lagunilla
- La Huerta
- La Yerbabuena
- Casa Fuerte

== Nearby airports ==
- Zamora (ZMM), Zamora, Mexico (63.2 km)
- Lic. Miguel de la Madrid Airport (CLQ), Colima, Mexico
- Lic. y Gen. Ignacio Lopez Rayon National Airport (UPN), Uruapan, Mexico (131.7 km)
- Don Miguel Hidalgo y Costilla International Airport (GDL), Guadalajara, Mexico (138.2 km)

== Climate ==
Climate data for El Fresno
Month	Jan	Feb	Mar	Apr	May	Jun	Jul	Aug	Sep	Oct	Nov	Dec	Year
Mean daily maximum °C (°F)	23.4 (74.1)	15.6 (60.1)	27.5 (81.5)	30.5 (86.9)	31.0 (87.8)	28.9 (84.1)	26.3 (79.3)	26.2 (79.1)	26.2 (79.2)	25.8 (78.4)	25.6 (78.1)	24.2 (75.6)	26.7 (80.1)
Mean daily minimum °C (°F)	−7.0 (19.4)	−1.5 (29.3)	1.0 (33.8)	1.0 (33.8)	1.0 (33.8)	7.0 (44.6)	6.0 (42.8)	7.0 (44.6)	4.0 (39.2)	4.0 (39.2)	−2.0 (28.4)	−4.0 (24.8)	−7.0 (19.4)
Average precipitation cm (inches)	2.5 (1)	0.51 (0.2)	0.51 (0.2)	0.51 (0.2)	2.8 (1.1)	15 (6.1)	20 (7.8)	17 (6.5)	13 (5.1)	4.3 (1.7)	1.3 (0.5)	1.0 (0.4)	77 (30.4)
Source: Weatherbase

== Cultural foods ==
- Birria
- Tamales
- Chile relleno
- Tacos

== Festivals ==
- March / April: Easter
- March 16-25: Fiestas Patronales de San Jose/ Funsion
- March 18: Commemoration of the petroleum expropriation
- April 13: Anniversary of elevation to city status (1891)
- May 21: Birthday of General Lázaro Cárdenas
- 7 August: Feast of San Cayetano
- October 4: Feast in honor of St. Francis of Assisi
- Oct. 19: Commemoration of the death of General Lázaro Cárdenas
- November 20: Anniversary of the Mexican Revolution
- December 1–12: Fiesta of Nuestra Virgen Guadalupana, (Our Lady of Guadalupe)

== Tour ==
- Tourist info

== Schools ==
There are only two schools in the town.

- - Colegio Lazaro Cardenas (Telesecundaria Comunitaria El Fresno)
- - Pre-Escolar

== See also ==
- Municipalities of Michoacán

Jiquilpan is also the birthplace of Lazaro Cardenas, president of Mexico. Jiquilpan is the only city with two presidents of the republic. It is the birthplace of Damian Alcazar, actor and movie director, who was in "El crimen del padre Amaro", and "La ley de Herodes", and some Hollywood Movies.
