= Villa Hidalgo, Nayarit =

Village in Nayarit, Mexico

Coordinates: 21°44′N 105°14′W

Villa Hidalgo is a village in Nayarit, Mexico.
