= Santa Rita, Jalisco =

Town in Jalisco, Mexico

Santa Rita
- Town
- Location in Jalisco, Mexico Santa Rita (Mexico)
- Coordinates: 20.44207°N 102.3938°W
- Country: Mexico
- State: Jalisco
- Municipality: Ayotlán
- Elevation: 1,579 m (5,180 ft)

Population (2020)
  - Total: 2,608
- Time zone: UTC−6 (Central Standard Time)
  - Summer (DST): UTC−5 (Central Daylight Time)
- Postal code: 47904

Santa Rita is a town in the southwest of the Ayotlán Municipality, Jalisco. It has 2,608 inhabitants during the 2020 Mexico census, it is located at 11.4 km from Ayotlán, 36 km from Atotonilco El Alto and 21 km from Yurécuaro, Michoacán.

The town is known for having a water park.
