= La Placita, Colorado =

La Placita
- Settlement
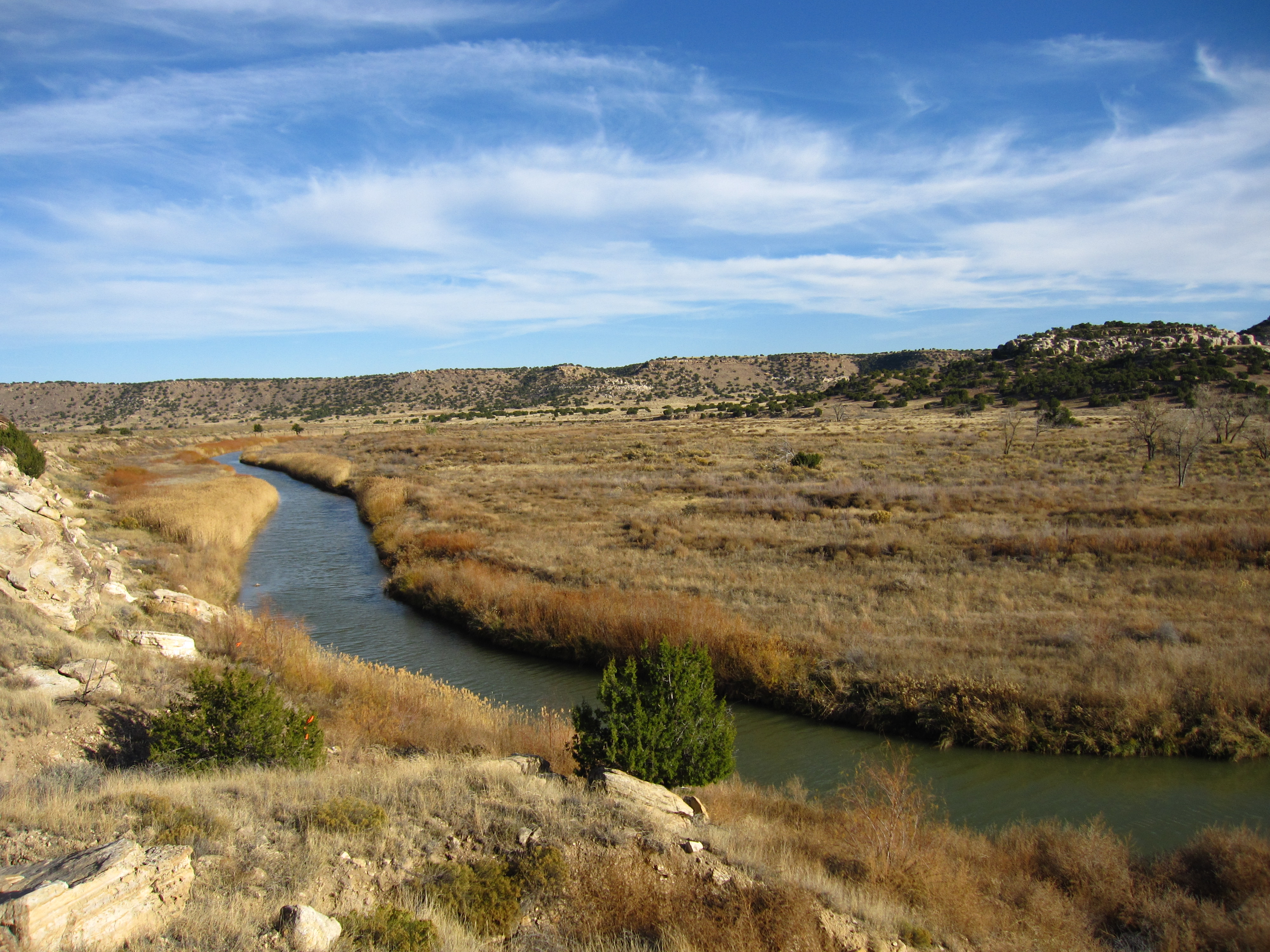
- The Purgatoire River Valley
- Etymology: Small plaza (New Mexico Spanish)
- Interactive map of La Placita
- Coordinates: 37.528033°N 103.781564°W
- Country: United States
- State: Colorado

La Placita was a small 1890s Hispanic settlement located in southeastern Colorado in the Purgatoire River Valley. The name "La Placita" is the New Mexican Spanish word for small plaza. It is located south of La Junta and east of Trinidad on the grounds of the Piñon Canyon Maneuver Site (PCMS).

== History and background ==
Hispanic settlement of the Purgatoire River Valley took shape in the late 1860s when the Cordova family, formally of Taos, New Mexico, built a fortified plaza. Soon after, other settlements followed. By 1874, the area had a population of roughly 450 people, and as was the case with most frontier settlements there was a higher percentage of men than women.

In the 1880s ranch consolidations began to take place in the area, often using public land for feeding grounds. British based Prairie Cattle Company bought and amassed 2.2 million acres south of the Arkansas River. This encroachment of Anglo peoples into the traditionally Mexicano and Hispanic lands began to change the landscape and community dramatically, especially as statehood and citizenship became factors after the Mexican American War. At the time of La Placita’s founding, the New Mexican settlers were outnumbered by settlers who moved to Colorado from other states.

La Placita was settled around 1890 and was occupied for roughly a decade before being abandoned by 1898. The people of La Placita never legally owned the land, but formed very permanent settlements which were thoughtfully arranged. This type of settlement pattern was historic in nature as most Mexicano populations would move out to a new area and begin to work and modify the land before attempting to claim legal ownership. The land had to be tested for its validity and fertility before a commitment could be made.

Abandonment of La Placita likely occurred due to a thinning of the Mexicano population. As populations moved out to settle new areas and territories they became more and more distanced from one another. This would make it difficult for homesteaders as they would find themselves a long trip from necessities such as midwives, healers, and churches. This lack of community likely lead to abandonment of sites which found themselves far from centers where necessities could be accessed more readily.

== Environment ==
La Placita is on the Purgatoire River. The Purgatoire River starts in the Sangre de Cristo Mountains of Colorado and ends when it meets the Arkansas River. The river is marked by mesas, rock promontories, arroyos, and canyons. The Purgatoire River is often the relied upon source of water in the region during drought. The area is characterized as arid with an average annual precipitation of 12 inches a year. The average temperature in the winter is 30 degrees Fahrenheit and 90 degrees Fahrenheit is the average temperature in the summer. The area contains a large number of grasslands, juniper trees, shrubs, and cacti. Local animal life includes mountain lions, bobcats, antelope, bear, raccoons, mice and rats, as well as a variety of birds.

La Placita is located between two canyons, Welsh and Red Rock, and is part of the lower Dakota Formation. The settlement was intentionally constructed on a terrace below the prairie but above the canyon. This placement protected the settlement from winter winds but still left it open to summer breezes when temperatures could spike to 110 degrees Fahrenheit.

== Archaeology ==
=== Survey ===
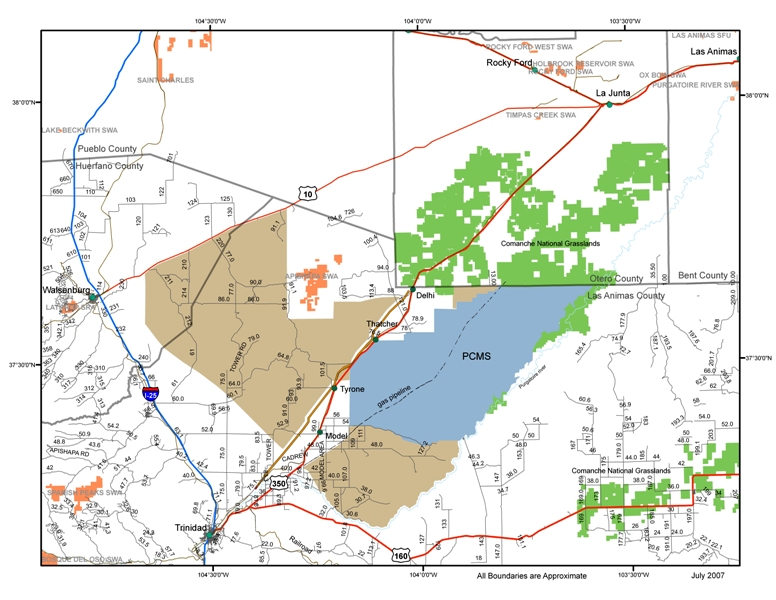
The Pinon Canyon Maneuver Site and surrounding area

After purchasing land to create the PCMS in the early 1980s, the U.S. Army hired archaeologists to document the material history of the area. From 1983 onward, archaeologists and architectural historians repeatedly surveyed the PCMS.

A 1993 survey conducted in the PCMS recorded fifty sites with standing structures and visible surface artifacts. Site 5LA6104, later named "La Placita", was among the sites recorded by the survey.

=== Investigation and excavation ===
The multi-household La Placita settlement consists of stone structures arranged in a crescent shape around an open area. The structures sit below rock outcrops and above an arroyo that feeds into Red Rock Canyon. Dr. Bonnie Clark, currently at the University of Denver, began field investigations at the site in 2000.

=== Structures ===
There are six primary structures, all constructed from local tabular sandstone and mud mortar. Architecturally, the walls were approximately 2.5 m high and had flat roofs, none of which survive in the present. The floors of the structures were packed earth, compacted through daily use.

The La Placita settlement appears to have at least three rooms for domestic use. There is one two-room structure and two one-room structures that are of a size consistent with domestic architecture in the region.

On the eastern edge of the site is a two-room structure that includes a fogon, a fireplace located in the southeast corner of the original room. Archaeological excavation determined that the two-room structure and another one-room structure were connected by a zaguan, a covered breezeway that was a typical feature of Hispanic architecture in the region. Such a feature may be considered an exterior room or workspace.

Because the attached one-room structure did not appear to have a heat source, it has also been suggested that it may have been a chapel, or capilla, because of its fine masonry and the presence of similar structures in other Hispanic settlements.

The one-room structure on the western edge of the series of structures is also thought have been for domestic use. Although it lacks a fireplace, it is probable that there was a cast-iron stove in one corner. This assertion is supported by the discovery of stove pieces in the area south of the structure. A terraced area just outside the doorway of the structure was most likely used to grow vegetables for the household.

La Placita is also thought to have several features relating to livestock, including a corral built against a rock face and a barn. One small structure is thought to be a chicken coop, supported by the discovery of eggshells and chicken bones throughout the site. The animal remains gathered from the site suggest that sheep, goats and cattle were all present at La Placita.

A stone masonry structure built into the hillside is thought to have functioned as a place for food storage. Similar storerooms have been found at other Hispanic sites, and the one at La Placita appears to be a soterrano that uses the natural insulation abilities of the hillside to protect perishable supplies.

=== Non-structural features ===
La Placita is also thought to have had a horno, a "beehive-shaped outdoor oven". A horno like the one at La Placita is a common feature of Nuevomexicano occupations and would have been shared by multiple households.

La Placita appears to have had a reliable water source located southwest of the structures. The residents of La Placita collected the natural water that leached through the rock by building a rock wall around the seep thus creating a small basin in which water collected.

=== The plaza ===
The plaza, central to nearly every New Mexican architectural and settlement pattern, is also an important aspect of the La Placita settlement and daily life. The plaza was a common space that echoed the plazas in villages where La Placita’s residents previously lived.

The plaza may have been used as a space for watching children, entertaining guests and performing ritual or traditional activities. Within the context of the regional Hispanic community, the plaza would have served as a place for inhabitants of the Purgatoire River area to gather and interact through feasts and religious celebrations.

=== Life at La Placita ===
Each room in the structure functioned as self-sufficient unit with a heating source - chimney or iron stove, window and door. A typical household at La Placita may have consisted of a married couple, children and other relatives. From the domestic space at the site, it is estimated that La Placita housed at least eighteen people.

The residents of La Placita sold livestock and sheep wool at market, but the settlement was most likely supported by several male residents that worked at larger regional ranches while women cared for children, prepared food, and raised livestock. The presence of mass-produced goods - such as apparel, an axe head, and nails - at La Placita suggests that the residents were engaged with the market economy.

== Site importance ==
La Placita, as an archaeological site, is an excellent illustration of what it meant to be Mexicano in Colorado during the end of the 19th century. It also gives insight into how people carefully modified the land even without having legal ownership. Finally, the short occupation of La Placita illuminates the effects of shifts in population as an influx of Anglo peoples moved into traditional Mexicano lands after the Mexican American War.
