= Zacualpan, Nayarit =

Zacualpan is a small town in the Mexican state of Nayarit at 21°15′N 105°10′W. It has 4,000-5,000 residents.
