= Penjamillo =

Coordinates: 20°06′N 101°54′W

- Municipality
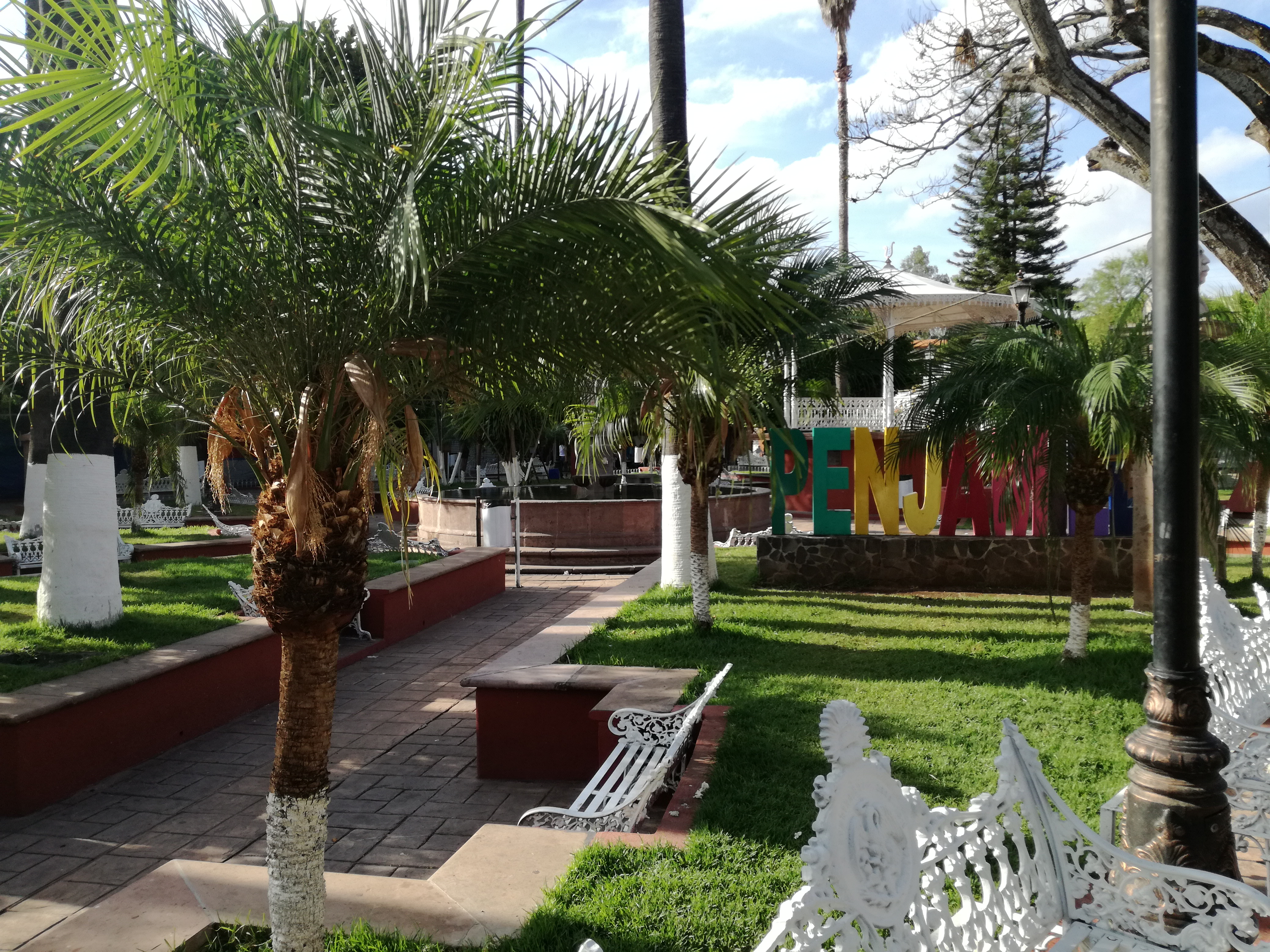

- Location in Mexico Penjamillo (Mexico)
- Country: Mexico
- State: Michoacán
- Demonym: (in Spanish)
- Time zone: UTC−6 (CST)

Penjamillo de Degollado is a municipality in the Mexican state of Michoacán.
