= La Placita de Morelos =

Coordinates: 18°31′58″N 103°35′18″W

La Placita, Michoacán, is a small town located in Michoacán, Mexico, near the Pacific coast. It is located approximately 1.4 km away from Playa La Placita, a beach on the Pacific Coast.

It has a population of 1,927 as of 2020.

A 7.6 magnitude earthquake struck the area on September 19, 2022.
