= Tomatlán, Jalisco =

Tomatlán
- Municipality and town
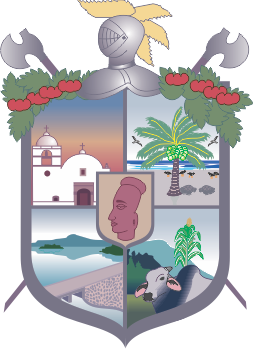
- Coat of arms

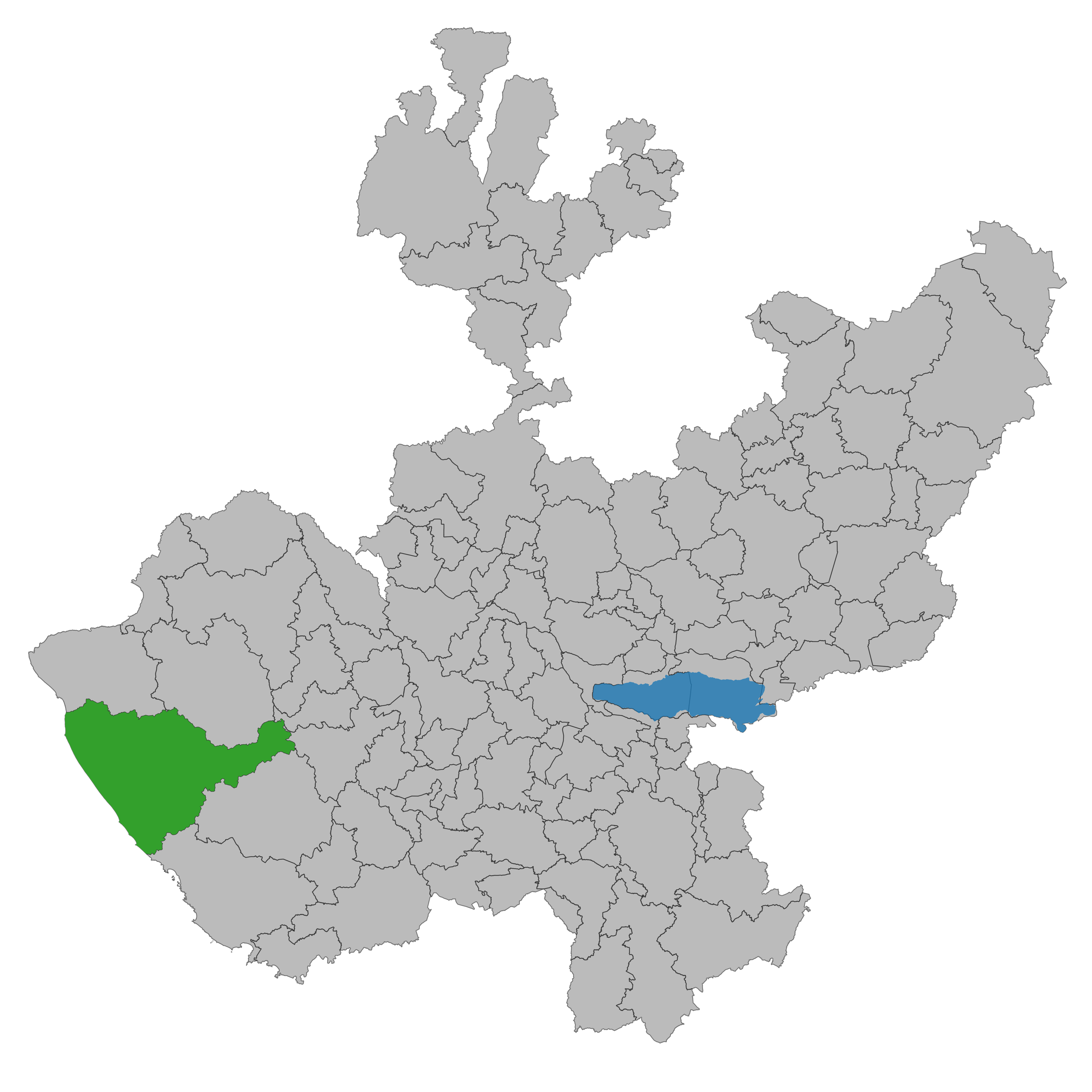
- Location of the municipality in Jalisco

- Location in Mexico
- Coordinates: 19°56′13″N 105°15′0″W
- Country: Mexico
- State: Jalisco

Area
  - Total: 3,015 km^{2} (1,164 sq mi)
  - Town: 2.96 km^{2} (1.14 sq mi)

Population (2020 census)
  - Total: 36,316
  - Density: 12.05/km^{2} (31.20/sq mi)
  - Town: 9,842
  - Town density: 3,320/km^{2} (8,610/sq mi)
- Time zone: UTC-6 (Central Standard Time)
- Website: http://www.tomatlanjal.gob.mx

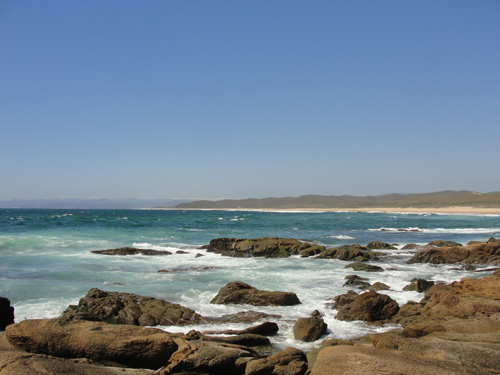
Chalacatepec

Tomatlán (meaning "Tomato land" or "place of tomato" from Nahuatl) is a town and municipality, in Jalisco south of Cabo Corrientes in central-western Mexico. The municipality covers an area of 3,015 km^{2}.

As of 2015, the municipality had a total population of 35,824 people.

The final portion of Yann Martel's novel Life of Pi is set in Tomatlán, where the character Pi Patel reaches land after being stranded in the Pacific Ocean.

== History ==
Before the arrival of the conquerors, the region was populated by various groups. Tomatlán apparently once had its own language, as the sixteenth-century relación of Villa Purificación mentions that several languages were spoken in coastal Jalisco, and names one of them as "Tomatec". On Holy Monday of 1525, from El Tuito the conquerors arrived in Tomatlan. The night they spent the night in a village of the cacique, they received them with dances and plumeríos. They wore crowns and scapulars, as they were part of the Province of Los Coronados de El Tuito. There they celebrated Holy Week and Easter. In the place occupied by the Cué, a pagan shrine, they built a "pajarete" church that Brother Juan de Villa Diego blessed, dedicating it to San Antonio.

They baptized the town and the river with the name of Easter, subsequently following Colima. Thus this town was subdued by Francisco Cortés de San Buenaventura. The region was very inhabited. Disseminated in it there were numerous villages currently occupying the place of some, small rancherías.

In 1541 this region revolted and had to go with its people Pedro de Alvarado from Santiago de Manzanillo twice to fight the insurgents. From 1533 to 1574 it was entrusted to Juan Fernández de Híjar with a seat in Villa de Purificación.

Through the proclamation the town knew, in 1730, that English soldiers were disembarking in the cove of Arcos and that the Justice of the Valley of Banderas lacked soldiers to make the defense. 50 soldiers and 100 locals came to the aid of him. They were commanded by Captain Diego de Betancourt.

At the beginning of the War of Independence in the year of 1810, Cura Miguel Hidalgo y Costilla sent his nephew Miguel the Lego Gallaga to coordinate the movement on the coasts of Colima, Jalisco and Nayarit.5

In October 1811, after the battle of Palo Blanco, Lego Gallaga, together with Sandoval and Toral, he retired to Mascota and the Coast along the course of the Banderas Valley, where he separated from them, reaching Tomatlán. Gallaga made words with the Sandoval, then, one of those who accompanied Sandoval made fire on the Lego, who was seriously injured. Sandoval immediately ordered him to be shot in front of the Temple of Santo Santiago; Gallaga, lying there on her knees, implored the mercy of God, sold her eyes herself with her handkerchief, and gave the voice of fire falling dead with two bullets. The Indians who were very fond of him, picked up his body, took him to the presbytery of the parish, opened a sepulcher in which an ecclesiastic was buried in a drawer from which they took him out, and then deposited the remains of Gallaga, being the tragic one The end of this famous layman, who gave so much to the troops of Nueva Galicia. Since 1825 belonged to the 6th. Canton of Autlán until 1878 when it happens to depend on the 10 canton of Mascota. The decree of September 23, 1878 already refers to Tomatlán as a municipal entity.

=== Location ===
Tomatlán is located west of the state at coordinates 19° 56' 13" north latitude and 105° 15' 0" west longitude; at a height of 50 meters above sea level.

=== Municipal limits ===
It has administrative limits with the following municipalities and / or geographical accidents, according to its location:

=== Orography ===
Its surface is made up of rugged areas (42%), hills and mountains that have heights ranging from 200 to 1,100 meters above sea level; semi-flat areas (41%) on hills and slopes with heights from 125 to 200 meters above sea level, and flat areas (17%).

The composition of the soils is of predominant types cambisol, already Eutrico or Chromic, Feozem Háplico and Regosol Eutrico; to the north of the population are small strips of Acrisol Ortico.

The municipality has a territorial area of 265,750 hectares, of which 44,224 are used for agricultural purposes, 112,400 in livestock activity, 108,220 are for forest use and 886 hectares are urban land, not specifying the use of 20. As far as the property refers to an extension of 124,669 hectares is private and another of 87,081 is ejidal; 54,000 hectares are communal property.

=== Hydrography ===
This municipality belongs to the central Pacific basin, sub-basin Tomatlán River. Its main currents are: Llano Grande river and streams: Los Prietos, Coyula, La Quemada, El Salado, Las Ánimas, El Tule and others of minor importance. They are also part of its hydrological resources, the dams: Cajón de Peñas, El Cobano and San Juan, in addition to the Laguna del Tule.

=== Climate ===
The climate is semi-dry, with dry winter and spring, and warm, with no well-defined winter thermal change. The average annual temperature is 26.9 °C, with a maximum of 34.1 °C and a minimum of 19.6 °C. The rainfall regime is recorded in the month of October with an average rainfall of 892.2 millimeters. The annual average of days with frosts is 33. The prevailing winds are heading south to north.

== Economy ==
Cattle, pigs, sheep and goats are raised, in addition to birds and hives. Farming produce highlights include corn, sorghum, rice, tobacco, watermelon, plantain, mango, papaya, pineapple, sunflower, chile, sesame and coconut palm. Precious woods are exploited such as: barcino, parota, mahogany, habillo, cedar, tampicirano, spring and purple rose. Mainly bass, brown, bass and carp are caught.

There are establishments that sell basic necessities and mixed stores that sell small-scale diverse items. Financial, professional, technical, communal, social, personal, tourist and maintenance services are provided. There are currently small industries in the municipal seat. The main branches are the transformation of food, dairy products, pastures and construction.

The main salt mines of the state of Jalisco are found.

== Tourism ==
=== El Chorro ===
El Chorro is a beach located 10 km from the town La Gloria. The beach is characterized by strong waves. El Chorro is surrounded by dunes and mangroves.

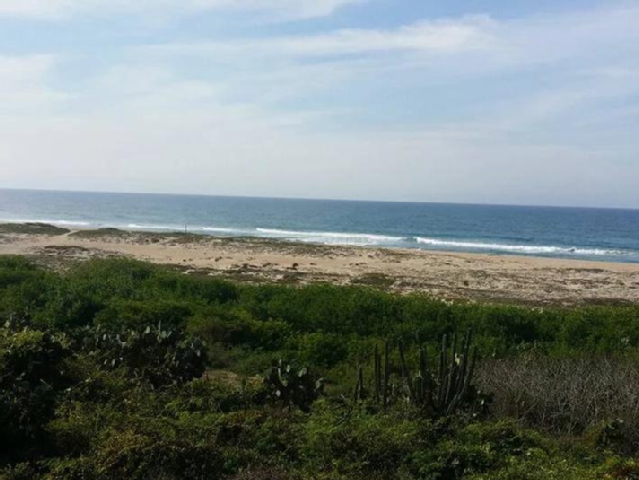
Terrenos frente al mar en costa alegre tomatlan

=== Peñitas ===
Peñitas is a beach surrounded by large rocks, contributing to the name. Peñitas is notable for the Nahuatl culture that previously dominated the surrounding area. Some artifacts like petroglyphs can be found on the beach.

=== Costa Majahuas ===
The beach of Majahuas has strong waves, it is attractive for fishing and for this reason we have the visit of people who love sport fishing during the year, during Easter the camp is traditional, since most of the families of many towns in the municipality, move at that time of year to spend a holiday in complete peace and in a constant harmony with nature, also has many families from other parts of the country who seek to get away from the intense noise and pollution of their places originally.

=== Chalacatepec ===
Pradisiaca white sand beach, which is part of the great coastline that makes up the municipality of Tomatlán, this charming place is made up of several scenarios, highlighting the vegetation, the sea and the group of rocks that frame the beach.

In its sands, one can witness a variety of wildlife and the blue sky mixes with the sea on the horizon.

Chalacatepec has become an ideal place for the reproduction of the beautiful sea turtle, since year after year it seeks the warmth of its beach to lay eggs, which are currently protected by a turtle camp that sits here.

=== Peñitas de la Cruz ===
This is another of the beautiful beaches that characterize Tomatlan. Ideal for swimming, resting and camping, receiving visitors who come to enjoy its attractions on weekends, it gives tourist life to the municipality.

=== Cajón de Peñas Dam ===
The largest dam in Jalisco, with its immense curtain that looks like a fortress that keeps the most picturesque landscapes, surrounded by a range of greens that contrast with each other and where water sports such as bass fishing, skiing and windsurfing are practiced. It also has comfortable cabins to rest and forget the daily routine.

=== The Painted Stone ===
Located on the banks of the Tomatlàn River, this unique cave painting in Mesoamerica, is 40 meters high by 8 meters long and 2 meters wide, and is pigmented in red.

It is noteworthy that in the entire riverbank of the Tomatlan River there are vestiges of ancient cultures, abundant petroglyphs among which a "Patolli Game" of which there are only two in western Mexico.

=== Temple of Saint James the Apostle ===
This parish, in the center of Tomatlan, is an architectural jewel of the Franciscan style, made of stone, lime and quarry. Its walls have a thickness of one and a half meters and its roof is half-round with a beautiful vault that tops the presbytery. The Baptistry and Sacristy are also vaulted; a quarry snail leads to the bell tower, climbing 49 reduced steps, which forces it to step on its side, to its low tower 6 meters base by 4 high.

== Notable people ==
- Randy Santana (born 1983), Mexican former professional footballer

== Government ==
=== Municipal presidents ===
Municipal president	Term	Political party	Notes
Trinidad Betancourt	1848		
Juan de Dios Rodríguez	1849		
Gregorio Betancourt	1871–1872		
Hilario Mariscal	1873–1875		
Genaro Menis	1877		
Socorro Araiza	1878		
J. de la Cruz Pérez	1879		
Damián Barbosa	1880		
Pedro Silva	1880		
J. de la Cruz Pérez	1881		
Concepción Gómez	1881		
Ambrosio Ríos	1881		
Rafael Macedo	1884		
Socorro Araiza	1885		
Apolinar González	1885–1886		
Agustín Betancourt	1887		
Apolinar González	1888		
Fiacro Ríos	1889		
Apolinar González	1891–1892		
Rafael Macedo	1893		
Norberto Betancourt	1894		
Juan Rentería	1895		
Manuel Arróniz	1896		
Félix A. Fernández	1897		
Norberto Betancourt	1898		
Apolinar González	1899		
Ambrosio Ríos	1900		
Apolinar González	1901–1902		
Juan Betancourt	1903		
Ambrosio Ríos	1904		
Pedro J. Gavica	1905		
Pedro Meléndez	1906		
Hilario González	1907		
Filiberto Guerrero	1908		
Ramón Parra	1909		
Norberto Betancourt	1910		
Filiberto Guerrero	1911		
Salvador Camacho	1911		
Pedro J. Gavica	1912–1913		
Gil Guijarro	1914–1915		
Feliciano Ramos	1916–1918		
Norberto Betancourt	1920		
David González	1921		
Gil Guijarro	1922		
Félix A. Fernández	1923		
Raúl Fernández Ríos	1924		
Enrique Betancourt Salgado	1925		
José María Díaz	1926		
Enrique Santamaría Salgado	1927		
Juan Rentería	1928–1929		
Cirilo Meléndez	1930	PNR	
Enrique Santamaría Salgado	1931	PNR	
Abel Salgado Meléndez	1932	PNR	
Enrique Santamaría Salgado	1933	PNR	
Abel Salgado Meléndez	1934	PNR	
Ignacio Salgado Meléndez	1935–1936	PNR	
Pablo González Rodríguez	1937	PNR	
Lorenzo Rico	1938	PRM	
Braulio V. García	1939	PRM	
Filiberto Cordero Gutiérrez	1940	PRM	
Ignacio Salgado Meléndez	1941	PRM	
Juventino Virgen Macedo	1942	PRM	
Juan Gaviño Domínguez	1943	PRM	
Abel González Alatorre	1944	PRM	
Pablo Santamaría Díaz	1945	PRM	
Juan Gaviño Domínguez	1946	PRI	
Gilberto Rentería Mariscal	1947–1948	PRI	
Jesús González Betancourt	1949	PRI	
Gilberto Rentería Mariscal	1950	PRI	
Amado Santamaría Díaz	1951	PRI	
Gonzalo Muñoz Joya	1952	PRI	
Diego Betancourt González	1953–1955	PRI	
Miguel Becerra Osorio	1956	PRI	
Eduardo Fierros Villalobos	1957	PRI	
Gonzalo Muñoz Joya	1958	PRI	
Pablo Velasco Morales	1959–1960	PRI	
Gilberto Rentería Mariscal	1962–1964	PRI	
Pablo Velasco Morales	1965–1967	PRI	
Teresa Guerra Arrizon	1968–1970	PRI	
Martín Alba Mendoza	1971–1973	PRI	
Rigoberto Velázquez Navarro	01-01-1974–31-12-1976	PRI	
Vidal Mora Castillo	01-01-1977–31-12-1979	PRI	
Armando Santamaría Palomera	01-01-1980–31-12-1982	PRI	
Amado Galindo Plazola	01-01-1983–1983	PRI	His political immunity was withdrawn because he ordered the assassination of councilor Adalberto Villa Hernández
Amado Santamaría Díaz	1983–31-12-1985	PRI	Acting municipal president
Gabriel Becerra Ocampo	01-01-1986–31-12-1988	PRI	
Bertha González Rubio	01-01-1989–1992	PRI	
Antonio Sahagún Virgen	1992–1995	PRI	
Javier Delgadillo Mancilla	1995–1997	PRI	
José Zárate Camarillo	01-01-1998–31-12-2000	PRD	
Óscar Estrella Bonilla	01-01-2001–31-12-2003	PRI	
Nélida Gutiérrez Rodríguez	01-01-2004–31-12-2006	PRD	
Soledad Meléndez González	01-01-2007–31-12-2009	PRI	
Juventino Sahagún Virgen	01-01-2010–30-09-2012	PRI; Panal	Coalition "Alliance for Jalisco"
Saúl Galindo Plazola	01-10-2012–30-09-2015	PRD	
Jorge Luis Tello García	01-10-2015–30-09-2018	PAN; PRD	
Jorge Luis Tello García	01-10-2018–30-09-2021	PAN; PRD; MC	Was reelected on 1 July 2018
Daniel Ruiz Benavides	01-10-2021–	MC	

== Sister cities ==
- (United States) Lincoln County, Nevada, USA
- (United States) Coconino County, Arizona, USA
- (United States) Aroostook County, Maine, USA
- (United States) North Slope Borough, Alaska, USA
- (France) Béthune, FRA
