= Zacoalco de Torres =

- Town and municipality
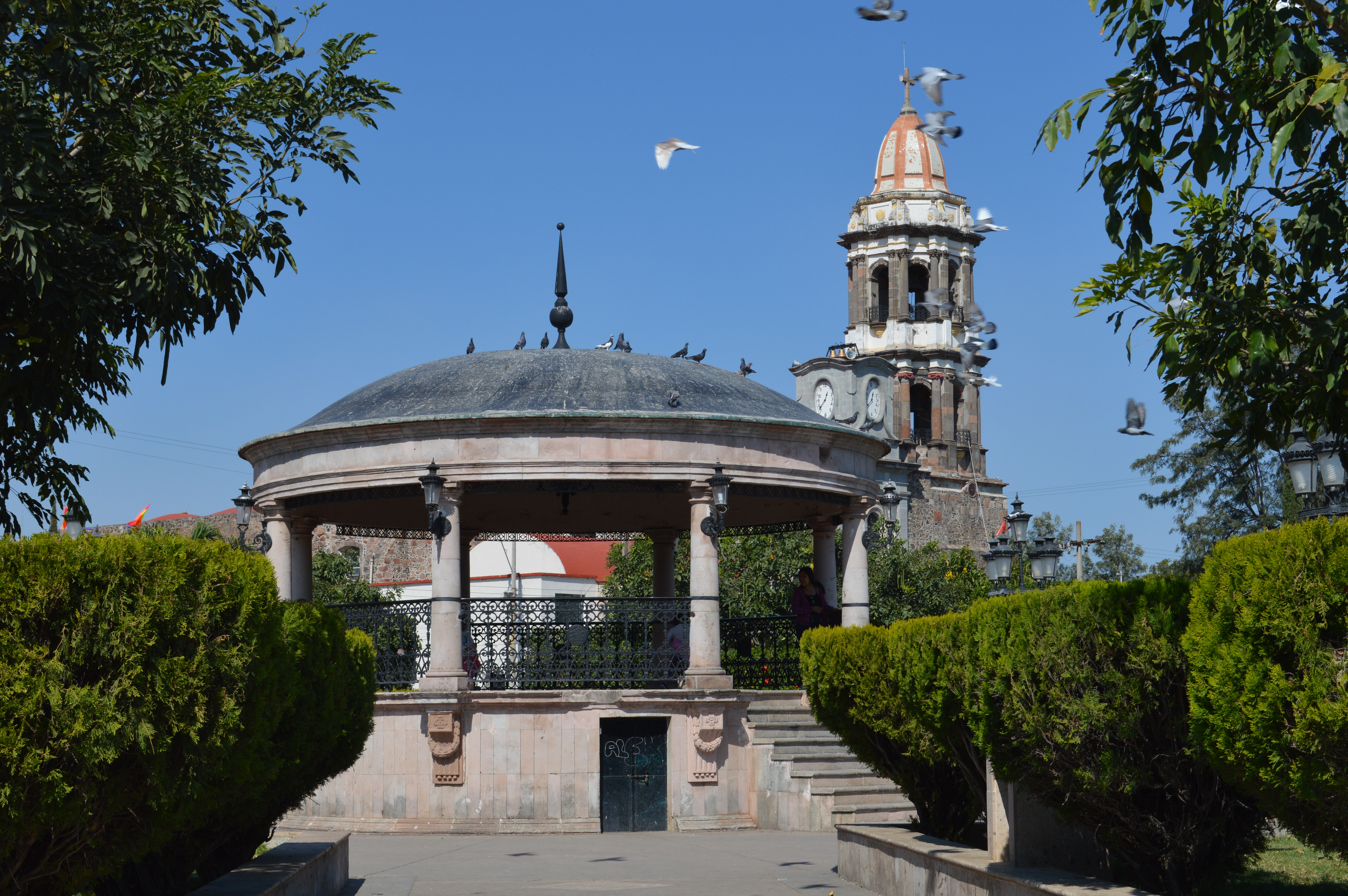
- Kiosk in the town square with the tower of the San Francisco Parish visible

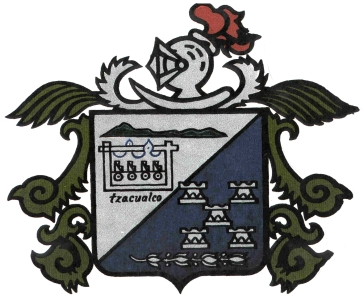
- Coat of arms

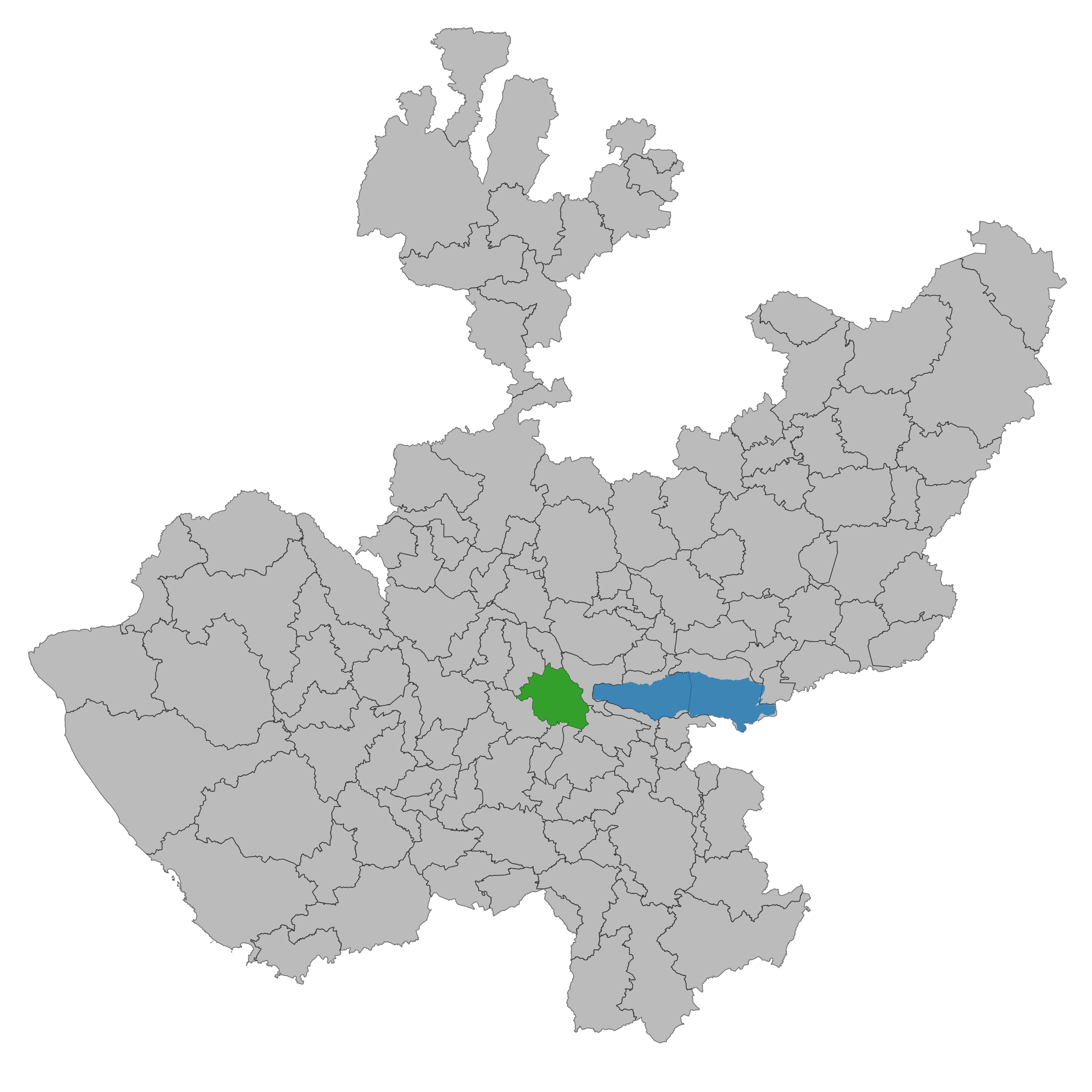
- Location of the municipality in the state of Jalisco

- Location in Mexico
- Coordinates: 20°14′N 103°35′W
- Country: Mexico
- State: Jalisco
- Region: Sur
- Settled: 1264

Area
  - Total: 479.1 km^{2} (185.0 sq mi)
  - Town: 5.97 km^{2} (2.31 sq mi)

Population (2020 census)
  - Total: 30,472
  - Density: 63.60/km^{2} (164.7/sq mi)
  - Town: 20,345
  - Town density: 3,410/km^{2} (8,830/sq mi)
- Time zone: UTC-6 (Central Standard Time)
- Postal code: 45750
- Area code: 33
- Website: zacoalcodetorres.gob.mx

Zacoalco de Torres, formerly Zacoalco (Nahuatl languages: Tzacoalco; "place of closed water"), is a town and municipality in Jalisco, Mexico. The municipality covers an area of 479.1 km^{2}. It is the primary production region of the equipal-style wood and pigskin furniture.

As of 2005, the municipality had a total population of 30,528.

== Geography ==
The municipality covers an area of 479.1 km^{2}. To the east lies the largest lake in Mexico, Lake Chapala.

=== Climate ===
Climate data for Zacoalco de Torres (1991–2020 normals, extremes 1959–present)
Month	Jan	Feb	Mar	Apr	May	Jun	Jul	Aug	Sep	Oct	Nov	Dec	Year
Record high °C (°F)	38 (100)	41 (106)	42 (108)	42 (108)	44 (111)	40 (104)	42 (108)	40 (104)	49 (120)	39 (102)	38 (100)	37.5 (99.5)	49 (120)
Mean daily maximum °C (°F)	26.7 (80.1)	28.6 (83.5)	30.6 (87.1)	32.5 (90.5)	33.5 (92.3)	31.3 (88.3)	28.7 (83.7)	28.3 (82.9)	27.7 (81.9)	28.0 (82.4)	27.7 (81.9)	26.8 (80.2)	29.2 (84.6)
Daily mean °C (°F)	17.7 (63.9)	19.2 (66.6)	21.0 (69.8)	23.0 (73.4)	24.7 (76.5)	24.7 (76.5)	23.0 (73.4)	22.9 (73.2)	22.6 (72.7)	22.1 (71.8)	19.9 (67.8)	18.2 (64.8)	21.6 (70.9)
Mean daily minimum °C (°F)	8.7 (47.7)	9.9 (49.8)	11.3 (52.3)	13.5 (56.3)	15.9 (60.6)	18.1 (64.6)	17.3 (63.1)	17.5 (63.5)	17.4 (63.3)	16.2 (61.2)	12.2 (54.0)	9.6 (49.3)	14.0 (57.2)
Record low °C (°F)	2 (36)	0 (32)	1 (34)	5 (41)	2 (36)	5 (41)	6 (43)	5 (41)	5 (41)	1.3 (34.3)	1.2 (34.2)	1 (34)	0 (32)
Average precipitation mm (inches)	7.4 (0.29)	5.2 (0.20)	1.9 (0.07)	0.5 (0.02)	9.8 (0.39)	68.9 (2.71)	105.4 (4.15)	81.0 (3.19)	83.8 (3.30)	31.2 (1.23)	6.7 (0.26)	1.9 (0.07)	403.7 (15.89)
Average precipitation days	0.5	0.6	0.1	0.0	1.0	6.0	9.5	8.0	7.7	2.7	0.5	0.3	36.9
Source: Servicio Meteorológico Nacional

== Economy ==
=== Industry ===
- Centro Logístico de Jalisco (Opened in 2015)
- Almería

== Government ==
=== Municipal presidents ===
Municipal president	Term	Political party	Notes
Fernando Basulto Limón	1927		
Antonio Ruiz Valencia	1928		
Francisco Hernández	1929	PNR	
Fernando Basulto Limón	1930	PNR	
Germán Basulto Limón	1931–1932	PNR	
Antonio Ruiz Valencia	1933	PNR	
Daniel Frías	1934	PNR	
Antonio Ruiz Valencia	1935–1936	PNR	
Sotero Ortega	1937–1938	PNR; PRM	
Germán Basulto Limón	1939	PRM	
Sotero Ortega	1940	PRM	
Antonio Ruiz	1941–1942	PRM	
Rodolfo Jiménez Barragán	1943–1944	PRM	
Antonio Ruiz Valencia	1945	PRM	
Luis García Villegas	1946–1947	PRI	
Pedro Alcaraz	1948	PRI	
Martín Velázquez Granados	1949–1952	PRI	
Pedro Madrigal Castillo	1953–1955	PRI	
Juan Camberos Flores	1956	PRI	
José Díaz de los Santos	1957	PRI	
Magdaleno Magallanes Madrigal	1958	PRI	
Pedro Madrigal Castillo	1959	PRI	
David Encarnación Ortega	1960–1961	PRI	
Salvador Reynoso Madrigal	1962	PRI	
Silvino Álvarez Barragán	1963–1964	PRI	
Rodolfo Jiménez Barragán	1965–1967	PRI	
Fernando Verónica Ocampo	1968–1970	PRI	
Rodolfo Jiménez Bonilla	1971–1973	PRI	
Salvador Azpeitia Cárdenas	1974–1976	PRI	
José Toscano Figueroa	1977–1979	PRI	
Juan González Castro	1980–1982	PRI	
Pedro Uribe Aceves	01-01-1983–31-12-1985	PRI	
José Reynoso Madrigal	01-01-1986–31-12-1988	PRI	
Miguel Mario Méndez Monje	1989–1992	Coalición Cardenista Jalisciense (CCJ)	
Francisco Contreras Díaz	1992–1995	PRI	
Alfredo Escobar Ruiz	1995–1997	PRD	
Braulio Gómez Cortés	01-01-1998–15-10-1998	PRI	Died in office, on 15 October 1998
J. Jesús Gómez Ortiz	16-10-1998–1999	PRI	Acting municipal president
Salomé Velázquez Ibarra President of the Municipal Council	1999–31-12-2000	PRI	
Ricardo Gómez Cortés	01-01-2001–31-12-2003	PRI	
José Gutiérrez Anguiano	01-01-2004–31-12-2006	PRI	
Javier Jiménez Álvarez	01-01-2007–31-12-2009	PRI	
Simón Fernando Llamas Bañuelos	01-01-2010–30-09-2012	PAN	
Javier Jiménez Álvarez	01-10-2012–30-09-2015	PRI; PVEM	Coalition "Compromise for Jalisco"
Luis Fernando Solórzano Madrigal	01-10-2015–30-09-2018	MC	
Javier Jiménez Álvarez	01-10-2018–30-09-2021	PRI	
Hilda Cachux Andrade	01-10-2021–30-09-2024	Morena	
