= 5th federal electoral district of Jalisco =

Federal electoral district of Mexico

Jalisco's 5th
- Electoral district of the Chamber of Deputies of Mexico

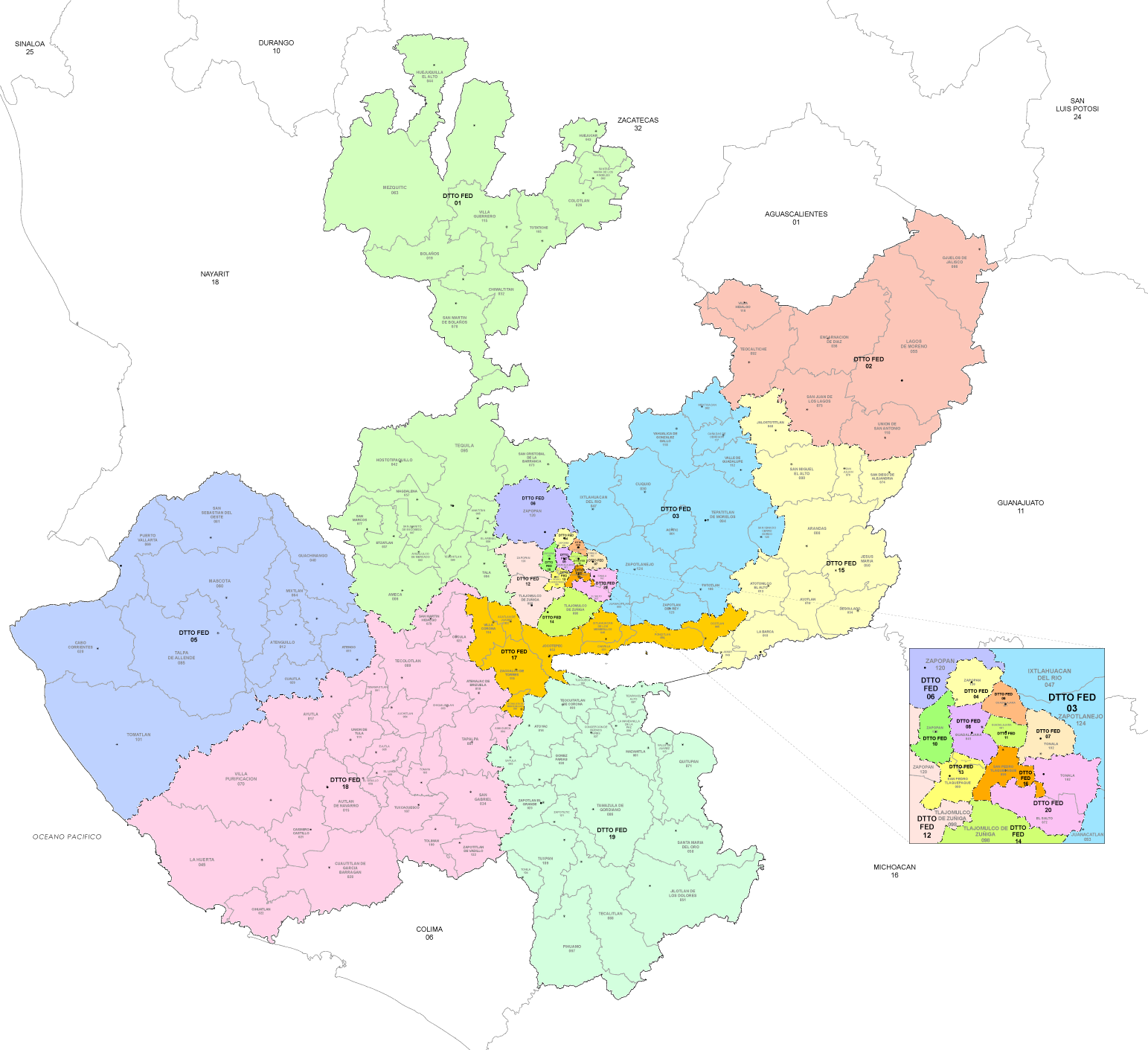
- 5th district

Incumbent
- Member: Bruno Blancas Mercado
- Party: ▌Morena
- Congress: 66th (2024–2027)

District
- State: Jalisco
- Head town: Puerto Vallarta
- Coordinates: 20°38′N 105°13′W
- Covers: 11 municipalities: Atengo, Atenguillo, Cabo Corrientes, Cuautla, Guachinango, Mascota, Mixtlán, Puerto Vallarta, San Sebastián del Oeste, Talpa de Allende, Tomatlán
- PR region: First
- Precincts: 165
- Population: 393,394 (2020 census)

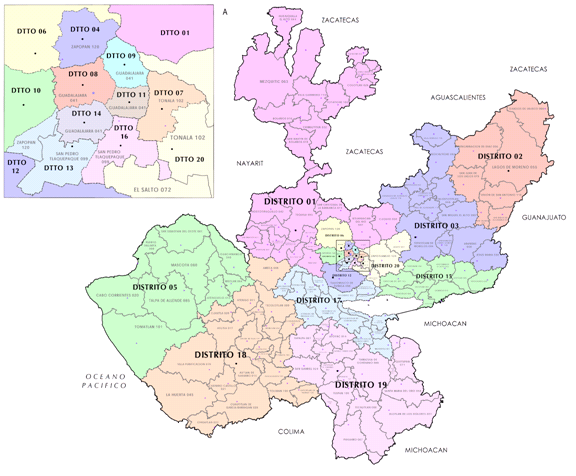
Jalisco's districts in 2017–2022

The 5th federal electoral district of Jalisco (Spanish: Distrito electoral federal 05 de Jalisco) is one of the 300 electoral districts into which Mexico is divided for elections to the federal Chamber of Deputies and one of 20 such districts in the state of Jalisco.

It elects one deputy to the lower house of Congress for each three-year legislative session by means of the first-past-the-post system. Votes cast in the district also count towards the calculation of proportional representation ("plurinominal") deputies elected from the first region.

The current member for the district, re-elected in the 2024 general election, is Bruno Blancas Mercado of the National Regeneration Movement (Morena).

== District territory ==
Under the 2023 districting plan adopted by the National Electoral Institute (INE), which is to be used for the 2024, 2027 and 2030 federal elections, Jalisco's 5th district is located in the west of the state on the border with Nayarit and the Pacific Ocean coast. It comprises 165 electoral precincts (secciones electorales) across 11 of the state's 125 municipalities:

- Atengo, Atenguillo, Cabo Corrientes, Cuautla, Guachinango, Mascota, Mixtlán, Puerto Vallarta, San Sebastián del Oeste, Talpa de Allende and Tomatlán.

The head town (cabecera distrital), where results from individual polling stations are gathered together and tallied, is the resort city of Puerto Vallarta. The district reported a population of 393,394 in the 2020 census.

== Previous districting schemes ==
Evolution of electoral district numbers
| | 1974 | 1978 | 1996 | 2005 | 2017 | 2023 |
|---|---|---|---|---|---|---|
| Jalisco | 13 | 20 | 19 | 19 | 20 | 20 |
| Chamber of Deputies | 196 | 300 | | | | |

2017–2022

Jalisco regained its 20th congressional seat in the 2017 redistricting process. The 5th district's head town was at Puerto Vallarta and it covered nine municipalities:
- Atenguillo, Cabo Corrientes, Guachinango, Mascota, Mixtlán, Puerto Vallarta, San Sebastián del Oeste, Talpa de Allende and Tomatlán.

2005–2017

Under the 2005 plan, Jalisco had 19 districts. This district's head town was at Puerto Vallarta and it covered 14 municipalities:
- Atengo, Atenguillo, Ayutla, Cabo Corrientes, Cuautla, Guachinango, La Huerta, Mascota, Mixtlán, Puerto Vallarta, Villa Purificación, San Sebastián del Oeste, Talpa de Allende and Tomatlán.

1996–2005

In the 1996 scheme, under which Jalisco lost a single-member seat, the district had its head town at Puerto Vallarta and it comprised ten municipalities:
- Ameca, Atenguillo, Cabo Corrientes, Guachinango, Mascota, Mixtlán, Puerto Vallarta, San Sebastián del Oeste, Talpa de Allende and Tomatlán.

1978–1996

The districting scheme in force from 1978 to 1996 was the result of the 1977 electoral reforms, which increased the number of single-member seats in the Chamber of Deputies from 196 to 300. Under that plan, Jalisco's seat allocation rose from 13 to 20. The 5th district's head town was at Colotlán in the extreme north of the state and it covered 18 municipalities:
- Acatic, Bolaños, Colotlán, Cuquío, Chimaltitán, Hostotipaquillo, Huejúcar, Huejuquilla El Alto, Ixtlahuacán del Río, Magdalena, Mezquitic, San Cristóbal de la Barranca, San Martín de Bolaños, Santa María de los Ángeles, Tequila, Totatiche, Villa Guerrero and Zapotlanejo.

== Deputies returned to Congress ==
(Mexico) National parties
- Current
- PAN
- PRI
- PT
- PVEM
- MC
- Morena
- PAZ
- Somos
- Defunct or local only
- PLM
- PNR
- PRM
- PNM
- PP
- PPS
- PARM
- PFCRN
- CON
- PANAL
- PSD
- PES
- PES
- PRD

Jalisco's 5th district
| Election | Deputy | Party | Term | Legislature |
|---|---|---|---|---|
| 1916 | Francisco Martín del Campo | | 1916–1917 | Constituent Congress of Querétaro |
...
| 1976 | José Mendoza Padilla | Institutional Revolutionary Party | 1976–1979 | 50th Congress |
| 1979 | Manuel Ojeda Orozco | Institutional Revolutionary Party | 1979–1982 | 51st Congress |
| 1982 | Leopoldo Hernández Partida | Institutional Revolutionary Party | 1982–1985 | 52nd Congress |
| 1985 | Alma Guadalupe Salas Montiel | Institutional Revolutionary Party | 1985–1988 | 53rd Congress |
| 1988 | Héctor Ixtláhuac Gaspar | Institutional Revolutionary Party | 1988–1991 | 54th Congress |
| 1991 | Samuel Fernández Ávila | Institutional Revolutionary Party | 1991–1994 | 55th Congress |
| 1994 | José Luis Mata Bracamontes | Institutional Revolutionary Party | 1994–1997 | 56th Congress |
| 1997 | Luis Fernando González Corona | National Action Party (Mexico) | 1997–2000 | 57th Congress |
| 2000 | Salvador Cosío Gaona | Institutional Revolutionary Party | 2000–2003 | 58th Congress |
| 2003 | Francisco Javier Bravo Carbajal | Institutional Revolutionary Party | 2003–2006 | 59th Congress |
| 2006 | Leobardo Curiel Preciado | National Action Party (Mexico) | 2006–2009 | 60th Congress |
| 2009 | Juan José Cuevas García | National Action Party (Mexico) | 2009–2012 | 61st Congress |
| 2012 | Rafael González Reséndiz | Institutional Revolutionary Party | 2012–2015 | 62nd Congress |
| 2015 | Luis Ernesto Munguía González | Citizens' Movement (Mexico) | 2015–2018 | 63rd Congress |
| 2018 | Lorena del Socorro Jiménez Andrade | National Regeneration Movement | 2018–2021 | 64th Congress |
| 2021 | Bruno Blancas Mercado | National Regeneration Movement | 2021–2024 | 65th Congress |
| 2024 | Bruno Blancas Mercado | National Regeneration Movement | 2024–2027 | 66th Congress |

== Presidential elections ==
Jalisco's 5th district
| Election | District won by | Party or coalition | % |
|---|---|---|---|
| 2018 | Andrés Manuel López Obrador | Juntos Haremos Historia | 56.7319 |
| 2024 | Claudia Sheinbaum Pardo | Sigamos Haciendo Historia | 58.5421 |
