= Región Costa Norte-Sierra Occidental, Jalisco =

Costa Norte-Sierra Occidental Region
- Region
- #9-Costa Norte-Sierra Occidental Region
- Country: Mexico
- State: Jalisco
- Largest city: Puerto Vallarta

Area
  - Total: 8,985 km^{2} (3,469 sq mi)

Population (2020)
  - Total: 349,380
- Time zone: UTC−06:00 (Zona Centro)

The Costa Norte-Sierra Occidental region is one of the regions of the Mexican state of Jalisco. It is part of the coastal region of Jalisco, comprising just eight municipalities with a population of 349,380 as of 2020.

== Municipalities ==
Municipality code	Name	Population		Land Area			Population density	
Municipality code	Name	2020	Rank	km^{2}	sq mi	Rank	2020	Rank
012	Atenguillo	4,176	7	820	320	7	5/km^{2} (13/sq mi)	6
020	Cabo Corrientes	10,940	4	1,454	561	2	8/km^{2} (19/sq mi)	5
038	Guachinango	4,199	6	936	361	6	4/km^{2} (12/sq mi)	7
058	Mascota	14,451	3	1,381	533	3	10/km^{2} (27/sq mi)	2
062	Mixtlán	3,638	8	434	168	8	8/km^{2} (22/sq mi)	4
067	Puerto Vallarta	291,893	1	1,017	393	5	287/km^{2} (743/sq mi)	1
080	San Sebastián del Oeste	5,086	5	1,204	465	4	4/km^{2} (11/sq mi)	8
084	Talpa de Allende	14,997	2	1,739	671	1	9/km^{2} (22/sq mi)	3
	Costa Norte-Sierra Occidental Region	349,380	—	8,985	3,469.13	—	39/km^{2} (101/sq mi)	—
Source: INEGI

=== Largest cities ===
Largest cities or towns in Costa-Sierra Occidental Region Source:
Rank		Municipality	Pop.
1	Puerto Vallarta	Puerto Vallarta	224,166
2	Ixtapa	Puerto Vallarta	39,083
3	Las Juntas	Puerto Vallarta	10,242
4	Talpa de Allende	Talpa de Allende	10,112
5	Mascota	Mascota	9,272
6	Las Palmas de Arriba	Puerto Vallarta	3,949
7	El Tuito	Cabo Corrientes	3,835
8	Guachinango	Guachinango	2,124
9	Ecoterra Paraíso	Puerto Vallarta	2,108
10	Mixtlán	Mixtlán	1,710
