= Fidencio Castillo =

Mexican artist

Fidencio Castillo Santiago (November 16, 1907 – July 29, 1993) was a Mexican artist, educator, and a founding member of the Salón de la Plástica Mexicana.

== About ==
He was born in Etzatlán, Jalisco, Mexico to Trinidad Castillo and Raymunda Santiago shortly before the Mexican Revolution. His younger sister, Rosa Castillo Santiago (1910-1989) was also an established artist.

Fidencio Castillo Santiago studied at the Academy of San Carlos and then at the Escuela Nacional de Pintura, Escultura y Grabado "La Esmeralda". He then taught at the latter for over thirty years and married to Paz Castillo Alarcón.

His work was exhibited in Mexico and abroad, including cities such as Tokyo and Kurashiki during the Mexican Art Exhibition in 1995 and in Phoenix, Arizona in 1967. In Mexico, major exhibitions include the Bienal Mexicana Contenporánea in 1960, the Salón de Invierno, Galería Plástica Mexiana in 1956, the Salón de Arte Mexicano in 1958 and the first Salón de Pintura y Escultura Contemporánea Jalisciense in 1964. In 1971, the Salón de la Plástica Mexicana hosted a retrospective of his work. Another was held in 2004 co-hosted by the Asociación de Artistas Plásticos de México, UNESCO and the Mexico City Metro, to honor both him and his sister, Rosa Castillo. He died in Mexico City from multiple causes at the age of 85. Today the Museo Histórico of Guachinango, Jalisco hosts a permanent exhibition by this author.
