= Rosa Castillo =

Rosa Castillo may refer to:

- Rosa Castillo Varó (born 1974), Spanish footballer
- Rosa Castillo (basketball) (born 1956), Spanish basketball player
- Rosa Castillo (artist) (1910–1989), Mexican sculptor
