= Guachinango =

Guachinango may refer to:

- Guachinango, Jalisco, a municipality in Jalisco state, Mexico
- Guachinango, a 1964 album by Dominican Johnny Pacheco
- Guachinango Island, a small islet in the San José Lagoon in San Juan, Puerto Rico
- Guachinango or Huachinango, a Spanish derivation from the Nahuatl language meaning red snapper, see red snapper (disambiguation)
