= Fray Nicolás de Jesús María =

Spanish preacher

Fray Nicolás de Jesús María was a religious carmelita born in Seville, Spain, during the last years of the reign of Carlos II (1734-1759). His parents were Francisco Sánchez Risco and María de Merino, whom called him Nicolás Sánchez Risco y Merino.

He was a preacher whose printed sermons were praised by other ecclesiastical authorities of the period. Also, he was prior of Orizaba, Oaxaca, Puebla and Mexico City.

== Life ==
At the beginning of the 18th century Fray Nicolás of Jesús María arrived at the Indians, as the American territory was then known. After a year as novice, he received the Carmelite habit at the convent of Puebla at the hands of Fray Bartolomé of Saint Joaquín on 1 April 1708. Nicolas preached at the Convent of the Remedios de Puebla, and later moved to the capitular school of Santa Ana in 1715.

In 1717 Fray Nicolás toured several convents, finally arriving at San Sebastián, Mexico. In 1720 he attended the school of theology and in three years obtained the charge of reader of theology. This was a position of considerable importance as in Trienio there were only one or two readers.

=== Preacher ===
For the year of 1725 fray Nicolás returned to the convent of San Sebastián. On 11 November of the same year, he preached for the first time his sermon "La Mano de los Cinco Señores" with which began to win popularity due to his oratory. Many of his sermons were published, the majority of them in Mexico. Some of his sermons were written in honour to Santa Teresa.

=== Civil servant ===
His fame as preacher enabled him to occupy some government charges, e.g. the presidency of the Hospice of Guadalajara in 1728.

== Foundation of the Carmen in San Luis Potosí ==
In 1735, fray Nicolás and his companion Fray José de la Asunción visited San Luis Potosí for the foundation of the Temple of Our Lady of Carmen. On 23 February 1749 he put the first stone for his construction. Fray Nicolás was the first carmelita in San Luis Potosí, where he won popularity because his sermons. After the foundation of the temple, returned to Mexico City to continue preaching his sermons in the convent of San Sebastián. Of these, "La Cátedra" it is the last print known.
