= Rafael González Reséndiz =

Mexican politician (born 1979)

- Born: 26 March 1979 (age 47); Puerto Vallarta, Jalisco, Mexico
- Occupation: Politician
- Political party: PRI

Rafael González Reséndiz (born 26 March 1979) is a Mexican politician affiliated with the Institutional Revolutionary Party (PRI). In the 2012 general election he was elected to the Chamber of Deputies to represent Jalisco's 5th district during the 62nd session of Congress.
