= Leobardo Curiel Preciado =

Mexican politician (born 1947)

- Born: 18 January 1947 (age 79); Jalisco, Mexico
- Occupation: Politician
- Political party: PAN

Leobardo Curiel Preciado (born 18 January 1947) is a Mexican politician affiliated with the National Action Party (PAN). In the 2006 general election he was elected to the Chamber of Deputies to represent Jalisco's 5th district during the 60th session of Congress.
