= Talpa de Allende =

- Municipality and city
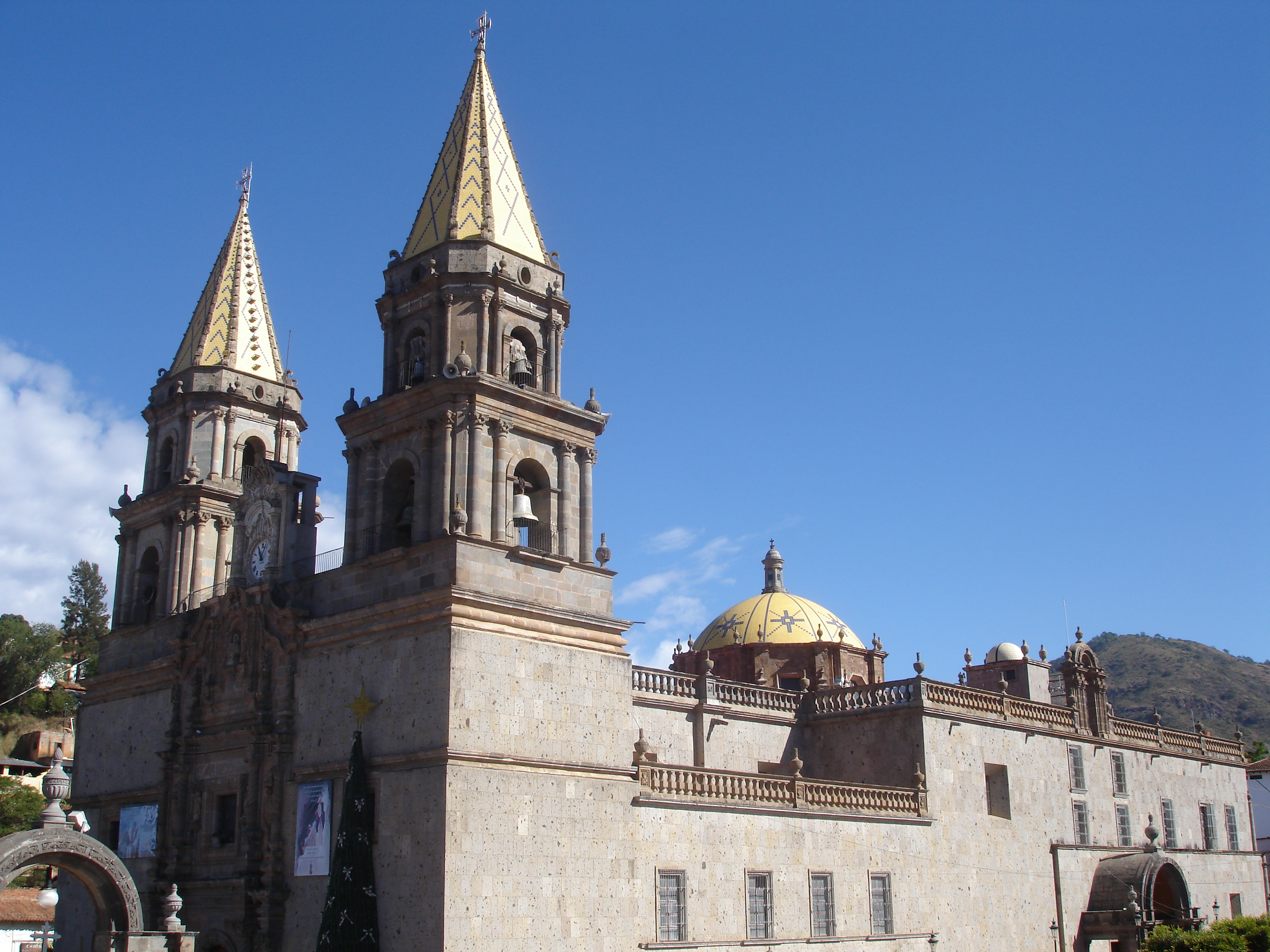
- Our Lady of Talpa Church

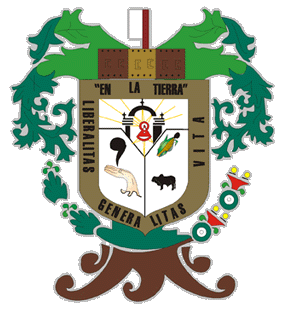
- Coat of arms

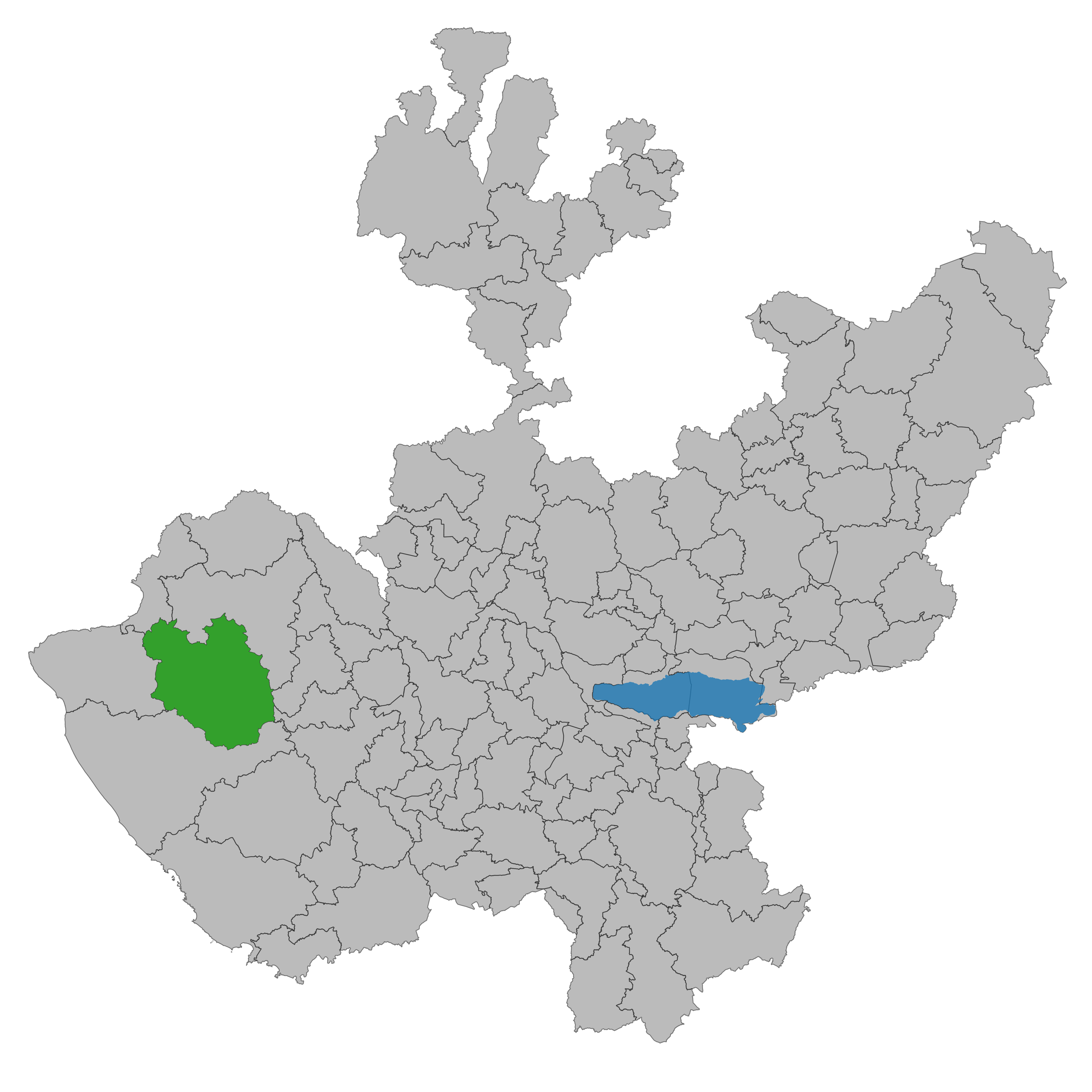
- Location of the municipality in Jalisco

- Location in Mexico
- Coordinates: 20°22′50″N 104°49′20″W
- Country: Mexico
- State: Jalisco

Area
  - Total: 1,996 km^{2} (771 sq mi)
  - City: 3.44 km^{2} (1.33 sq mi)
- Elevation: 1,134 m (3,720 ft)

Population (2020 census)
  - Total: 14,997
  - Density: 7.514/km^{2} (19.46/sq mi)
  - City: 10,112
  - City density: 2,940/km^{2} (7,610/sq mi)

Talpa de Allende is a city and municipality in Jalisco, Mexico. Surrounded by pine-covered mountains, Talpa de Allende is a silver mining town founded by the Spanish in 1599. The name "Allende" is in honor of General Ignacio Allende.

Talpa is the destination of a popular pilgrimage route. In the center of Talpa is the church of Nuestra Señora del Rosario, which is the location of the tiny Virgen del Rosario statue, also called "La Chaparrita", meaning the short one, who is believed to perform miracles. Her birthday is celebrated October 7, when millions of people walk to Talpa every year. Another date she is visited is during Easter Week. Approximately 3 million people attend the celebrations of "La Chaparrita" each year. The walk can be anywhere from a few kilometers to a hundred or more depending on the starting point. The most famous walk is the called "Ruta del Peregrino" (Pilgrim's Route). The Route is 117 km long, starting in the city of Ameca and ending in Nuestra Señora del Rosario church. It includes several climbs of hundreds of meters. During Easter week, there are stands selling food and drinks all along to route.

== History ==
It was the capital of the Tlallipan (Tlalipan) cacicazgo. The site was inhabited by a tribe of origin Nahuatl. Towards 1532 Nuño de Guzmán he began to send explorers to these lands from the Holy Spirit Village of Greater Spain, today Tepic, Nayarit, and that was when the inhabitants were subject to the Spanish crown. When Nuño de Guzmán left Nueva Galicia, he divided the domains among his most striving captains Juan de Oñate Juan and Cristóbal de Oñate, Juan Fernández de Hijar, touching the latter Tlallipan. He entered the village peacefully towards 1540. At the arrival of the peninsulars, Talpa was in what is now known as the Bairro Alto, southeast of the current town.

In 1599, when Aranjuez's rich minerals were established, the first Spanish families settled. Thus, by a decree of the Real Audiencia of Guadalajara saw the first light the town that received the title of Santiago de Talpa. The Constitution of 1857 was not well received. Prominent conservative Remigio Tovar rose up in arms, joining the conservative party in the Reform War. He was defeated by general Juan Nepomuceno Rocha at Cerro de los Ocotes, in which Tovar's forces suffered 7 casualties. Talpa was a welcoming haven for influential politicians when Guadalajara fell to the conservatives. It was also a kind of headquarters of the government troops that entered and went without encountering any resistance, during this time when encounters and scuffles were staged between the two sides and of political instability, the arises in these directions the Colonel Antonio Rojas, who was commissioned to pacify the region and to fight Remigio Tovar, who had as its center of operations the square of Mascota. Rojas, for his pyromania instincts and his great cruelty soon received the nickname "El Nero de Jalisco".

In 1871 Porfirio Díaz proclaimed the Plan de la Noria and rose up against the government of Benito Juárez, being defeated by General Alatorre. After leaving Mexico City, he spent a few weeks in Talpa disguised as a bell smelter. During the Mexican Revolution the village was fortified from the attacks from supporters of Venustiano Carranza by forming a general meeting of neighbors and forming a local defense corps that guarded the square; but on June 23, 1913, chief carrancist Santos Arreola came to ask for surrender, but bad weather forced them to flee.

1844 establishes town hall; 30 April 1871 a department is formed comprising the municipalities of Talpa and Tomatlán, with Talpa being the head. From 1825 to 1844 it belonged to the 6th canton of Autlán de Navarro. On 18 September 1885 by decree number 155 the village was elevated to the category of village under the name of Talpa de Allende in honor of the insurgent chief Ignatius Allende.

In 2015, the city was designated part of the "Pueblos Mágicos" national program.

== Geography ==
Talpa de Allende is located in the west of the state of Jalisco, within the extreme coordinates 20° 05′ 00″ at 20° 30′ 55″ of north latitude and of the 104° 42′ 30″ to the 105° 13′ 25″ west longitude; at a height of 1,134 meters above sea level.

The municipality adjoins to the north with the municipalities of Puerto Vallarta and Mascota; to the east with Mascota, Atenguillo, Cuautla and Tomatlán (Jalisco)' Tomatlán; to the south with the municipality of Tomatlán; to the west with the municipality of Cabo Corrientes.

=== Physical Geography ===
==== Orography ====
In general its surface is made up of rugged areas (77%) heights ranging from 2,100 to 2,500 meters above sea level. Semi-flat zones (13%) they are located in the south of the municipal headwaters, with heights ranging from 600 to 1,300 msnm. Flat areas (10%) located in the northwest of the municipal headland, are formed by heights of 1,200 meters above sea level.

==== Soil ====
The territory consists of land from the tertiary period. The composition of the soils is predominantly chestnut Chesnut, as well as lateritic yellows, prainearose and reddish soil, and reddish forest brown. The municipality has a territorial area of 227,952 ha-hectares, of which 15,375 are used for agricultural purposes, 31,128 in livestock activity, 176,987 are for forest use, 283 are urban land and 2,078 hectares have other use, not specified 2,101. As far as the property is concerned, an area of 169,637 hectares is private and another is 56,214 ejidal; there is no communal property. Please note that 2,101 hectares do not specify property type.

==== Hydrography ====
Its hydrological resources are provided by the rivers: Talpa, San Nicolás, Cuals, San José and Bramador; by the streams: Crumbled, La Quebrada, Las Palomas, El Corazón, Toledo, Camacho, Gran Juez and Los Lobos, among the most representative. It also has springs that supply water to some localities.

=== Climate ===
Talpa de Allende has a humid subtropical climate, with dry winter and spring, and with no well-defined winter thermal change. The average annual temperature is 21.3 C, with a maximum of 29.5 C and a minimum of 13.2 -C. The rainfall regime is recorded between the months of June and July, with an average rainfall of 1,002.9 mm. The annual average of frost days is 27.5. The prevailing winds are in a southerly direction.

=== Flora & wildlife ===
The natural vegetation is mostly pine–oak forest, composed of pines (Pinus), oyamel (Abies religiosa), oaks (Quercus), ash (Fraxinus) and walnut (Juglans). In the semitropical lower parts there is havillo, capomo, parota, spring, purple rose and Spanish cedar.

There is a cloud forest (mesophilic forest) in the municipality, with the native maple Acer binzayedii. Binzayedii refers to the founding of Qatar MBZ which sponsored scientific research that determined that the species in Talpa is unique in the world, which makes this maple forest very special.

On January 30, 2016, the Government of the State of Jalisco through the Secretariat of Environment and Territorial Development announced the creation of a Natural Protected Area Arce Forest State Park published in Section V of the Official Newspaper The State of Jalisco. date" - "publication" - "Official"- "The"-date-access-" ('doi')

== Government and politics ==
Its form of government is democracy, it depends on the Jalisco state government and federal Mexico; elections are held every 3 years, where the municipal president and his cabinet are elected. The Municipal President is C. Martín Eduardo Guzmán Peña, Institutional Revolutionary Party PRI.

The municipality has 178 towns, the most important being: Talpa (municipal head), Ocotes, La Cuesta, Cabos, La Cañada, Desmoronado and El Cuale.

== Infrastructure and economy ==
=== Housing ===
It has 3,266 homes, which are usually private. The 89.71% have electricity service, 68.74% have drainage and drinking water service. Its construction is usually based on brick, concrete and partition.

=== Services ===
The municipality has services of drinking water, sewerage, street lighting, markets, trail, cemeteries, road, public toilet, public safety, transit, parks, gardens and sports centers.

79.4% of the population has drinking water; in sewer coverage is 71.5% and in electricity service 85.4%.

=== Education ===
The population's 90.88% is alpha-alphabetism-alfabeta, of which 29.56% has ended primary education. The municipality has 19 preschool, 43 primary-primary education, 10 secondarys and two bachilleratos.

=== Healthcare ===
Health care is attended by the health center, which is advised by the Ministry of Health and depends on health jurisdiction No.8 based in Puerto Vallarta. In addition, the Mexican Social Security Institute and private doctors provide their services. The System for Integral Family Development (DIF) is responsible for social welfare.

=== Transportation and communication ===
It has fax service, telegraph, telephone, radio, television, Internet and radio telephony service. Transportation takes place via the Guadalajara-Puerto Vallarta highway. It has a network of rural roads that connect the villages. Public buses are available. It has a small airport, Talpa de Allende Airport, that has flights to Puerto Vallarta, San Sebastián del Oeste and Guadalajara. The main airlines that operate are: Aerotaxis de la Bahía and Transportes Aéreos de Nayarit.

== Demographics ==
According to the II population and housing count, the municipality has 13,612 inhabitants, of which 6,703 are men and 6,909 are women; 0.36% of the population are indigenous. By 2010 the population is expected to be 14,786.

=== Religion ===
90.60% profess Catholic religion, 7.36% are believers in [Jehovah's Witnesses], there are also Protestant and believers of other religions. 0.28% of the inhabitants held no religion.

For religious worship it has the Basilica of Our Lady of the Rosary, the Parish of Lord San José and chapels in the localities.

== Culture ==
- Painting stand out the mural "The Miracle of the Renewal of the Image of the Virgin of the Rosary" and the mural of the Holy Trinity.
- Craft: chicle handcrafts, with which they make baskets, furniture, pots, pots, jars, jars, vases, pots. Leather huaraches, belts and saddles are also made.
- Typical Costumes charro costume for men and China for women.

=== Sites of interest ===
- The Shrine of the Virgen de Talpa: in style Romanesque Architecture and Neoclassical-Neoclassical Architecture, dates from 1782
- The Parish of Lord San José: in colonial style, built in the year 1600.
- The Chapel of the Ore of El Cuale: in colonial style, built in 1870.
- The Chapel of Concepción del Bramador: in colonial style.
- The Chapel of the Resurrection.
- Sanctuary of Our Lady of the Rosary.
- The municipal palace.
- The waterfalls of Aranjuez.

=== Places to visit ===
- Welcome arch dedicated to pilgrims and visitors in the entrance.
- Calzada de las Reynas: opened on November 18, 2004, and created for he community of pilgrims that visit Talpa de Allende and in honor of all the queens of Mexico. A pathway of statues of the virgins.
- Cruz de Romero
- Museum of the Talpa Virgin where her story is told as well as the history of Talpa de Allende.
- Maple forest of Talpa de Allende with more than 56,000 acres (23,000 ha) of maple and pine trees.

=== Sports ===
It has sports centers, where it is practiced: football, frontenis and volleyball. It also has a cultural center, theater, charro canvas, square, parks, gardens and library.

=== Gastronomy ===
Birria, pozole, tamales, rotisserie chicken, rabbit, meat with tomatillo and chilaquiles; guava fruit leather, sancocho, figs, and various milk confectioneries; rompope and ponche of fruits such as peach, nance, capulín, pineapple, guava and pomegranate

=== Holidays and celebrations ===
- Virgen de la Candelaria from 25 January to 2 February.
- Romería de Tecomán: first Sunday in March.
- Romería in honor of Lord St. Joseph: from 11 to 19 March.
- Anniversary pilgrimage of the Coronation of the Virgen del Rosario de Talpa: from 4 to 12 May.
- Feast of the Renewal: September 10 "Bath of the Virgin" (It consists of cleaning all the jewels and changing the clothes of Ntra.Sra.del Rosario de Talpa) and from September 11 to 19 the ninth Renewal.
- Independence day: 15 and 16 September.
- Liturgical Party in Honor of Our Lady of the Rosary of Talpa: 7 October
- Feast of the Virgen de Guadalupe: 9–12 December

== In popular culture ==
- In Juan Rulfo novel, 'El llano en llamas' refers to Talpa: "[...][...] Although I knew that Talpa was far away and that we would have to walk a lot under the sun of the days and the cold, of the nights of March [...] ".
- The film "Talpa" was filmed here, based on a short story by Juan Rulfo.

== Sister City ==
Talpa de Allende has one sister city:

- (United States) - Lynwood, California, USA
