= Francisco Javier Bravo =

Mexican politician (born 1967)

- Born: 18 February 1967 (age 59); Puerto Vallarta, Jalisco, Mexico
- Education: University of Guadalajara
- Occupation: Politician
- Political party: PRI

Francisco Javier Bravo Carbajal (born 18 February 1967) is a Mexican politician affiliated with the Institutional Revolutionary Party (PRI). In the 2003 mid-terms he was elected to the Chamber of Deputies to represent Jalisco's 5th district during the 59th session of Congress, and previously served in the 55th session of the Congress of Jalisco.
