= Salvador Cosío Gaona =

Mexican politician (born 1961)

- Born: 26 January 1961 (age 65); Guadalajara, Jalisco, Mexico
- Status: casado con Paulina Corella Gomez
- Occupation: Politician
- Agent: Notario público
- Title: abogado
- Family: hijos 5

Salvador Cosío Gaona (born 26 January 1961) is a Mexican politician from the Partido Revolucionario Institucional (PRI). In the 2000 general election he was elected to the Chamber of Deputies to represent Jalisco's 5th district during the 58th session of Congress.
