= Rosa Castillo (artist) =

Mexican sculptor (1910–1989)

Rosa Castillo Santiago (September 4, 1910 – February 13, 1989) was a Mexican sculptor, and founding member of the Salón de la Plástica Mexicana.

== Life ==
She was born in Guachinango, Jalisco, Mexico at the start of the Mexican Revolution to parents, Trinidad Castillo and Raymunda Santiago. Her older brother Fidencio Castillo Santiago (1907–1993) was also an established artist. She grew up in this very rural town, going to school and helping her mother with household chores including grinding corn to make tortillas and chopping wood. The remoteness of the area protected it somewhat from the momentous changes occurring because of the Mexican Revolution. Since childhood she wanted more from life than that of traditional rural women, looking beyond the mountains surrounding her hometown. She began creating small clay figures, an early indication of her talent for sculpture.

At that time, the only way for a woman to move away from home was to marry, which she did. She gave birth to a daughter, Socorro, but shortly afterwards her husband died. She was free to move to Mexico City with her daughter, which she did in 1940. However, it was not easy. She found the chaotic city difficult to adjust to, but remained to study and to work as well as raise her child. At first she worked long hours as a seamstress in a factory, leaving her daughter with a sitter. Initially she went to night school, but soon abandoned it. After a period of uncertainty she discovered Escuela Nacional de Pintura, Escultura y Grabado "La Esmeralda" in 1944 and was attracted to the environment and the tools of the artists’ trade. Her work during this time mostly consisted of small clay figures and those made of wood and stone. Her teachers included Federico Cantú, Alfredo Zalce, Feliciano Peña, Jesús Guerrero Galván, Carlos Orozco Romero all in painting in drawing. In sculpture her teachers included José L. Ruíz, Luis Ortiz Monasterio and Francisco Zúñiga.

== Career ==
She teaching at primary schools in 1946. Between 1955 and 1957, she was one of the founders of the Talleres de Artesanías (Handcraft and Folk Art Workshops) in 1955. Her teaching work took her to various parts of Mexico to give classes and as a chaperone for field trips. In 1958, she was an assistant to Francisco Zúñiga with a project for the Instituto Mexicano del Seguro Social.

She exhibited her work in individual and collective exhibitions in Mexico and the United States. Exhibitions of her work include the III Sculpture International at the Philadelphia Museum of Art (1949), an individual show in Mexico City (1952), Salón Anual de Escultura (1958), I Bienal Nacional de Escultura México and the Salón de Pintura y Escultura Contemporánea Jaliscense (1964).

In 1963, the Museo de Zacatecas acquired for its collection the pieces called "Maternidad" in stone and "Niño" in wood. The Instituto de Arte de México acquired "Cabeza de niño Chamula" in clay in 1965.

In 1947, she received second place as a competition at the Escuela Nacional de Artes Plásticas. In 1958, she received the Acquisition Prize of the Salón de la Plástica Mexicana at the Salón Annual de Escultura. In the following year, her work Mujer encinta was recognized by the Salón de la Plástica Mexicana. In 1962, her piece called Mujer sentada won the first Bienal Nacional de Escultura, which is now an important piece in the collection of the Museo de Arte Moderno. Other recognitions of her work include those from the Salón de Pintura y Escultura Contemporánea Jaliscience in 1964 and the Instituto de Arte de México in 1964. In 1987, her hometown named her one of its “Illustrious Children” along with her brother Fidencio Castillo. She died in Mexico City of respiratory failure at aged 78. A retrospective of her and her brother's work was sponsored by Asociación de Artistas Plásticos de México, UNESCO and the Mexico City Metro in 2004.
