= Juan José Cuevas García =

Mexican politician (born 1965)

- Born: 2 April 1965 (age 61); Nayarit, Mexico
- Occupation: Politician
- Political party: PAN

Juan José Cuevas García (born 2 April 1965) is a Mexican politician from the National Action Party (PAN). In the 2009 mid-terms he was elected to the Chamber of Deputies to represent Jalisco's 5th district during the 61st session of Congress.
