= San Sebastián del Oeste =

- Municipality and town
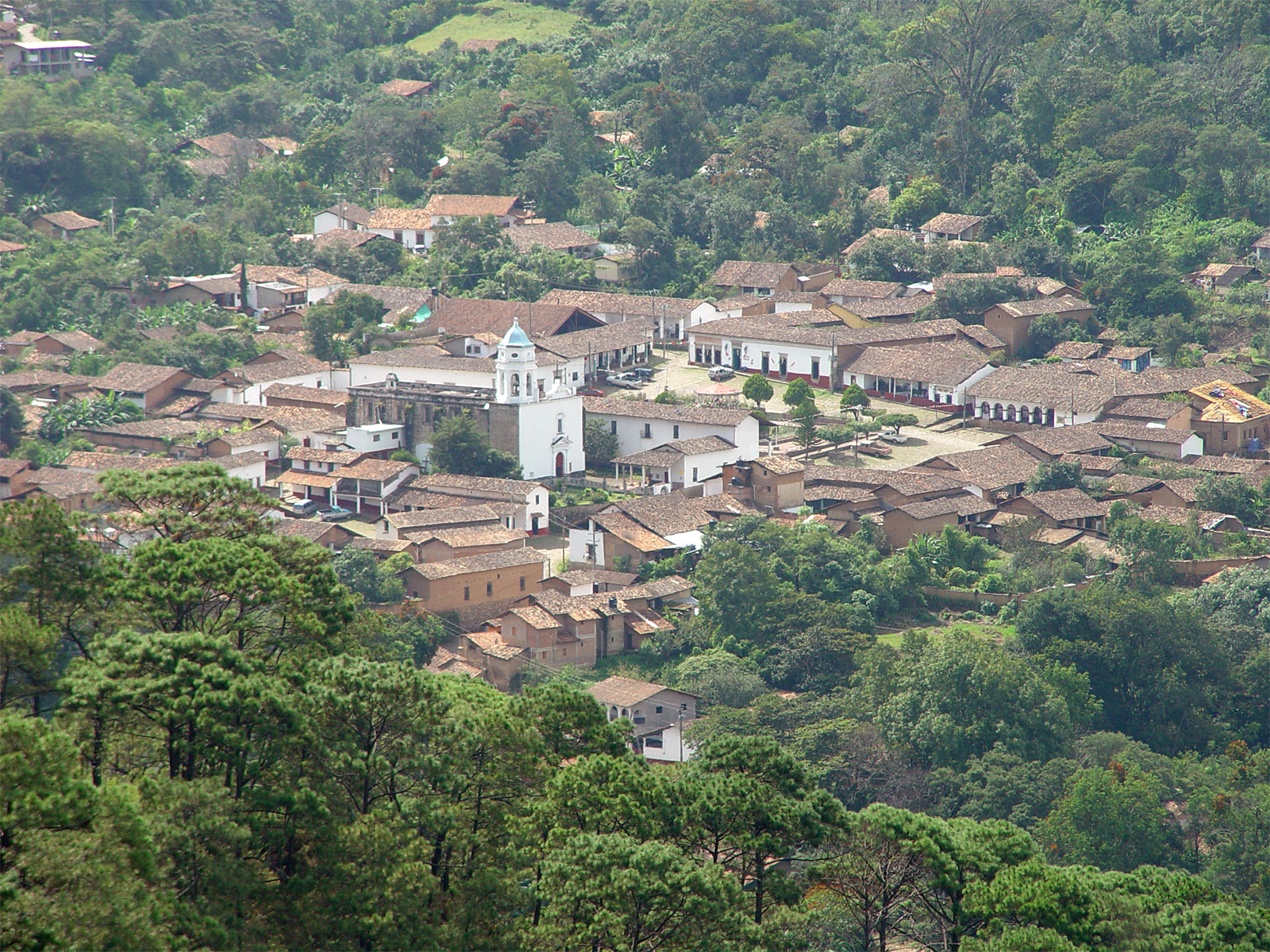
- San Sebastián del Oeste is nestled in a narrow mountain valley

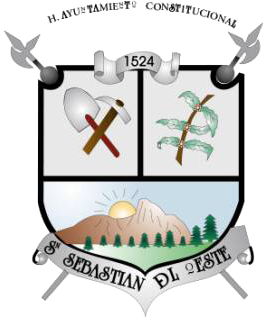
- Coat of arms
- Nickname: El Real
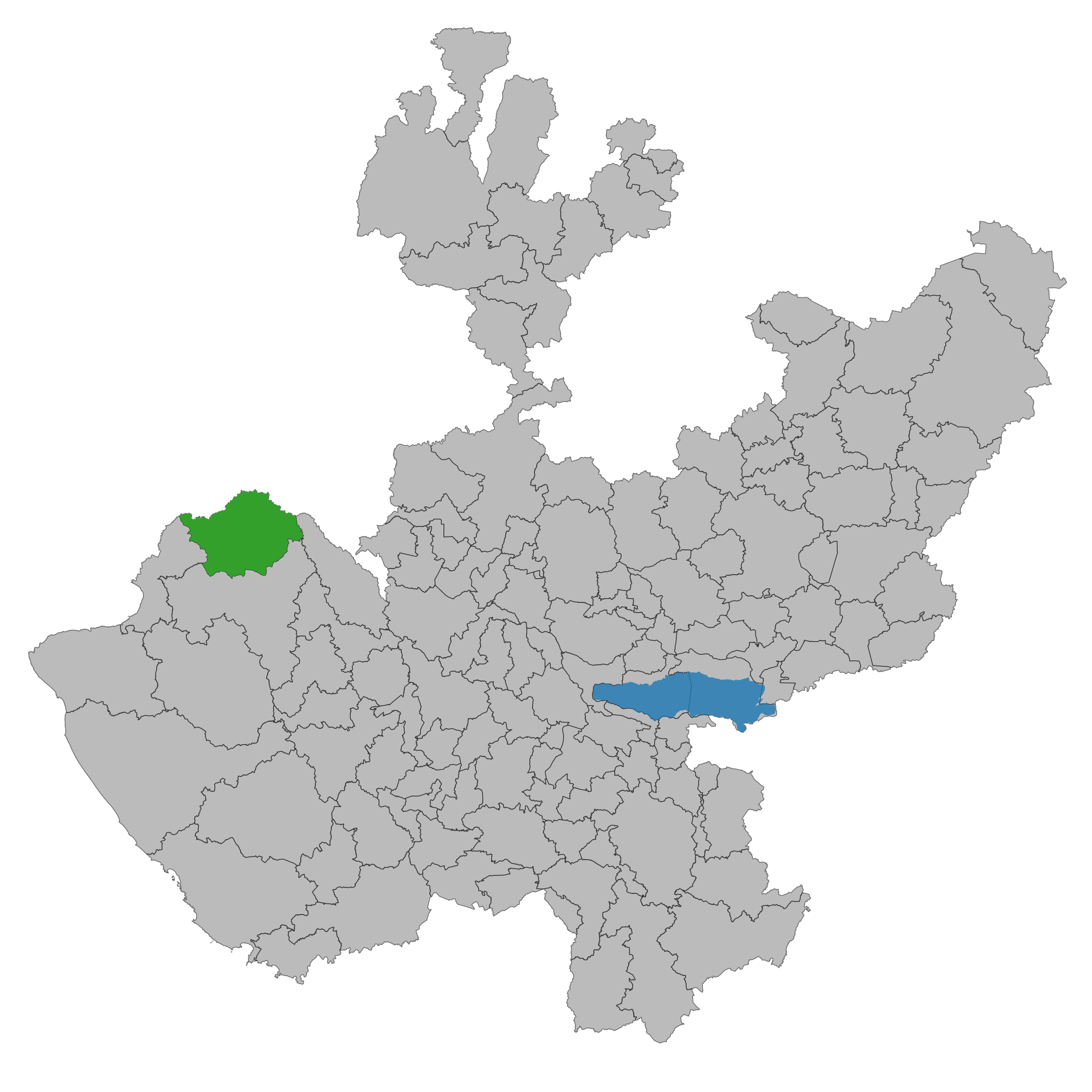
- Location of the municipality in Jalisco

- Location in Mexico
- Coordinates: 20.76114°N 104.852273°W
- Country: Mexico
- State: Jalisco

Government
  - Municipal president: Aurora Ponce Peña; MC

Area
  - Total: 1,117 km^{2} (431 sq mi)
  - Town: 0.8 km^{2} (0.31 sq mi)
- Elevation: 1,480 m (4,860 ft)

Population (2020 census)
  - Total: 5,086
  - Density: 4.553/km^{2} (11.79/sq mi)
  - Town: 632
  - Town density: 790/km^{2} (2,000/sq mi)
- Time zone: UTC-6 (Central Standard Time)

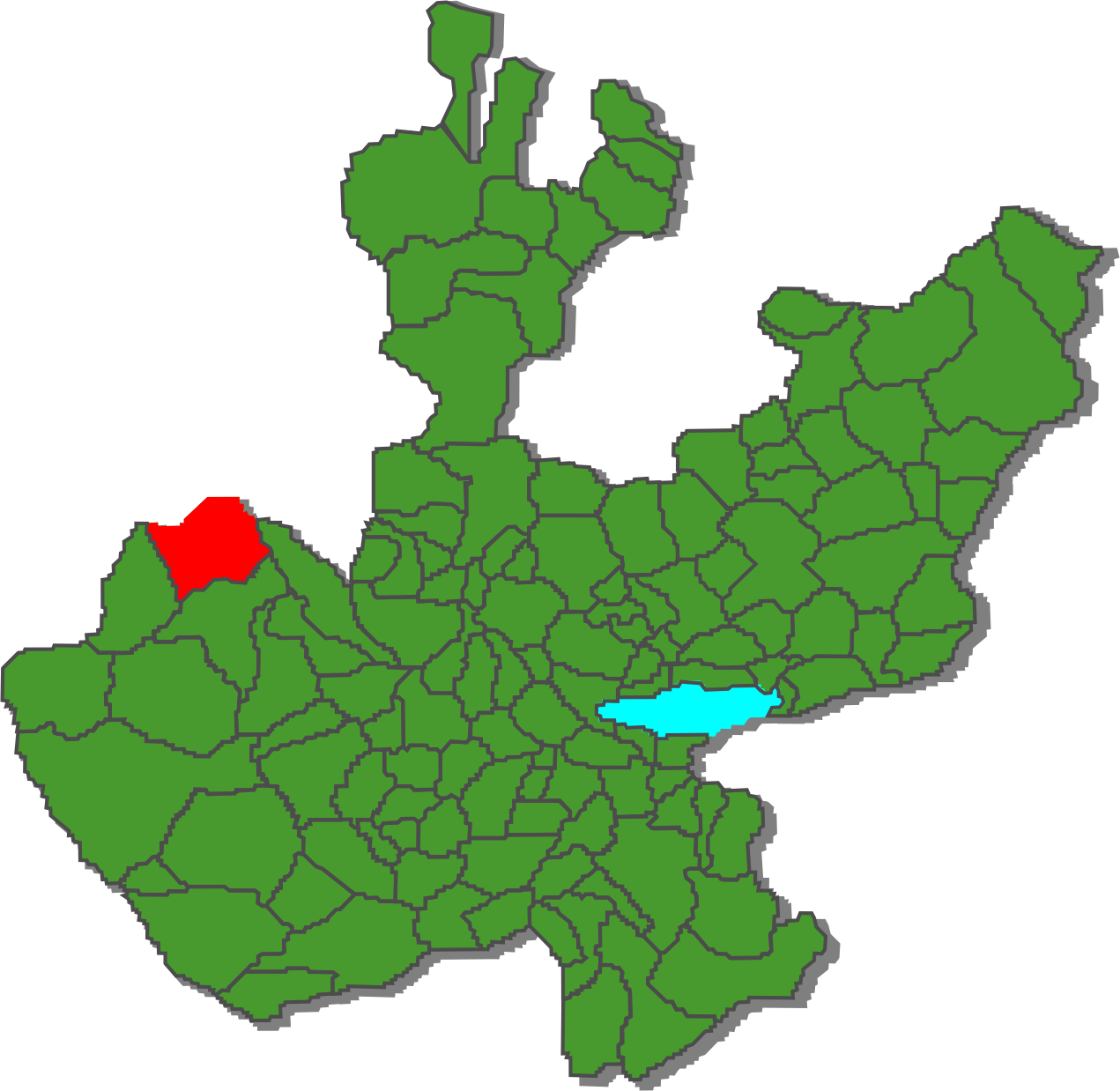
Other map showing the location of the Municipality of San Sebastián del Oeste in Jalisco state.

San Sebastián del Oeste (Spanish: [san seβasˈtjan del oˈeste]) is a town and municipality, located on the western part of Jalisco state, Mexico, between 20°39' 45" - 21°02' 30" N and 104°35' 00" - 104°51' 00" W, at a height of 1,480 metres (4,856 ft).

== Geography ==
The municipality of San Sebastián del Oeste borders the state of Nayarit to the north; to the south, the municipality of Mascota; to the east, the municipalities of Guachinango and Mascota; and to the west, Puerto Vallarta.

The city and municipality are served by an airfield.

== History ==
San Sebastián was founded as a mining town in 1605, during the early Spanish colonial Viceroyalty of New Spain period. Gold, silver and lead were mined in the area. More than 25 mines and a number of foundries were established by 1785.

The town was formally established as a city in 1812.

== Population ==
At the start of the 21st century, San Sebastián town had a population of less than 1,000 people.

It reached a peak population of around 20,000 people by 1900. The prosperity of the town declined after the revolution of 1910.

== Features ==
San Sebastián del Oeste is a designated Pueblo Mágico, one of the towns maintaining their historical character and promoted by the federal government as tourism destinations. It also receives tourists visiting nearby Puerto Vallarta on the coast to the west. Recent road improvements reduced transit time from Puerto Vallarta to under 2 hours.

- The Church of Saint Sebastian, whose original construction was in 1608, was designed in the Colonial Spanish Baroque style. It has notable architectural details, including Corinthian columns and ceiling vault frescos.
- Many structures in the city and municipality were built of cut stone and/or adobe in the 19th and earlier centuries, and remain unchanged. Some old haciendas in the municipality have been purchased and restored in recent decades.
- The city is on the Tentative List

=== Fiestas ===
The town is known for its fiestas for religious holidays:

- January 20 — a fiesta in honor of Saint Sebastian.
- August 15 — a fiesta dedicated to the Virgin of the Asunción.
- October 7 — a fiesta for the Virgin of the Rosary.
- December 12 — the Virgin of Guadalupe is venerated at the small town of Los Reyes, near San Sebastian del Oeste city in the municipality. The Fiesta of Guadalupe occurs throughout Mexico on this date.

== Government ==
Its form of government is democratic and depends on the state and federal government; elections are held every three years, when the municipal president and her/his council are elected. The municipal president is Aurora Ponce Peña, from the Citizens' Movement party, who was elected in the elections on 6 June 2021.

=== Municipal presidents ===
Municipal president	Term	Political party	Notes
Ignacio Aguirre	1867		
Francisco Landeros	1868–1869		
Pablo Encarnación	1872		
Herculano Robles	1873		
Manuel Gil	1873		
Pablo Encarnación	1874		
Alberto Peña	1876–1877		
Pablo Encarnación	1879–1880		
Concepción Encarnación	1882		
Manuel Gil	1883		
Alberto Peña	1884		
Calixto Sánchez	1885		
Francisco Sánchez	1886		
Concepción Encarnación	1887		
Calixto Sánchez	1888		
B. Bernal	1889		
Francisco Sánchez	1890		
Ricardo Ramos	1891–1892		
Calixto Sánchez	1892		
Francisco Sánchez	1893		
Calixto Sánchez	1894		
Aureliano Sánchez	1895		
J. Francisco López	1896		
Calixto Sánchez	1897		
Alberto García	1898		
Francisco López	1899		
Manuel Gil	1900		
Calixto Sánchez	1901		
Isidro Robles	1902		
Calixto Sánchez	1903–1904		
Aureliano Sánchez	1905		
Abraham González	1906		
Aureliano Sánchez	1909		
Calixto Sánchez	1908		
Aureliano Sánchez	1909		
José Robles	1910		
Samuel Sánchez	1911		
Efrén Aguirre	1912–1913		
Agustín Encarnación	1914		
Alfonso Ducreux	1915–1916		
Antonio Siordia	1917		
Isidro Robles	1918		
Federico Bermúdez	1919		
Ramón Villanueva	1920		
Samuel Sánchez	1920		
Antonio Peña	1920		
Ramón VIllanueva	1920		
Agustín Encarnación	1921		
Amado Sánchez	1921		
Samuel Sánchez N.	1922		
Pedro Trujillo	1922		
José Robles	1923		
Ramón Villanueva	1923		
Agustín Encarnación	1923		
Ignacio Zaragoza	1923–1924		
Pedro Trujillo	1924		
Ignacio Zaragoza	1925		
J. Guadalupe Arredondo	1926		
Agustín Encarnación	1926		
Antonio Esparza	1926		
Antonio Siordia	1926		
Samuel Sánchez N.	1927		
Adrián Sánchez N.	1927		
Feliciano Guerrero	1928		
Alfonso Ducreux	1929	PNR	
Pastor Siordia Morales	1930	PNR	
Adolfo Ducreux	1930	PNR	
Miguel Bernal Siordia	1931	PNR	
Ruperto Guerrero	1932	PNR	
Adrián Sánchez Noriega	1933	PNR	
Heliodoro Aguirre García	1934	PNR	
José Luis Bermúdez E.	1935	PNR	
Manuel Gil E.	1936	PNR	
Juan Manuel Bernal	1936	PNR	
Juan Quintero	1937	PNR	
José María Trujillo	1938–1939	PRM	
Julián Dueñas Lepe	1940	PRM	
José Medina Vázquez	1941	PRM	
José María Trujillo B.	1942	PRM	
Julián Dueñas Lepe	1943–1944	PRM	
Heliodoro Aguirre García	1945–1946	PRM	
Feliciano Guerrero López	1947–1948	PRI	
Heliodoro Aguirre García	1949–1952	PRI	
Leopoldo López Orendáin	1953	PRI	
Gonzalo Montes Villalvazo	1954	PRI	
Feliciano Guerrero López	1954	PRI	
Guillermo Gómez García	1954–1955	PRI	
Francisco Vázquez V.	1955	PRI	
Guillermo Gómez García	1955	PRI	
Juventino Bernal L.	1956	PRI	
Luis González Siordia	1957	PRI	
Francisco Sánchez Islas	1958	PRI	
Alfredo Sánchez Sandoval	1959–1961	PRI	
José María Trujillo Bernal	1962–1964	PRI	
Arnulfo Ponce Peña	1965–1967	PRI	
Ma. del Consuelo Trujillo González	01-01-1968–31-12-1970	PRI	
Gabriel Arredondo López	01-01-1971–31-12-1973	PRI	
Francisco Aguirre Gómez	01-01-1974–31-12-1976	PRI	
José Manuel López Bernal	01-01-1977–31-12–1979	PRI	
J. Jesús Hernández Pulido	01-01-1980–31-12-1982	PRI	
Bertha Aguirre Sánchez	01-01-1983–31-12-1985	PRI	
Heliodoro Gil Gil	01-01-1986–31-12-1988	PRI	
Jesús Martínez Ibarra	1989–1992	PRI	
Fernando Cervantes Gómez	1992–1995	PRI	
Ignacio Gudiño Salazar	1995–1997	PRI	
Juan Yáñez Morales	01-01-1998–31-12-2000	PRI	
Vicente Aguirre Rosas	01-01-2001–31-12-2003	PRI	
Miguel Cibrián Bernal	01-01-2004–31-12-2006	PRI	
Efrén Álvarez López	01-01-2007–31-12-2009	PRD; PT; Convergence	"Coalition for the Good of All"
Juan Yáñez Morales	01-01-2010–30-09-2012	PRI; Panal	Coalition "Alliance for Jalisco"
Yesenia Pulido Ávalos	01-10-2012–30-09-2015	PRI; PVEM	Coalition "Compromise for Jalisco"
Jesús Damián Vázquez Barajas	01-10-2015–30-09-2018	MC	
Luis Alberto Arredondo López	01-10-2018–30-09-2021	PVEM	
María Aurora Ponce Peña	01-10-2021–	MC	

== Images ==
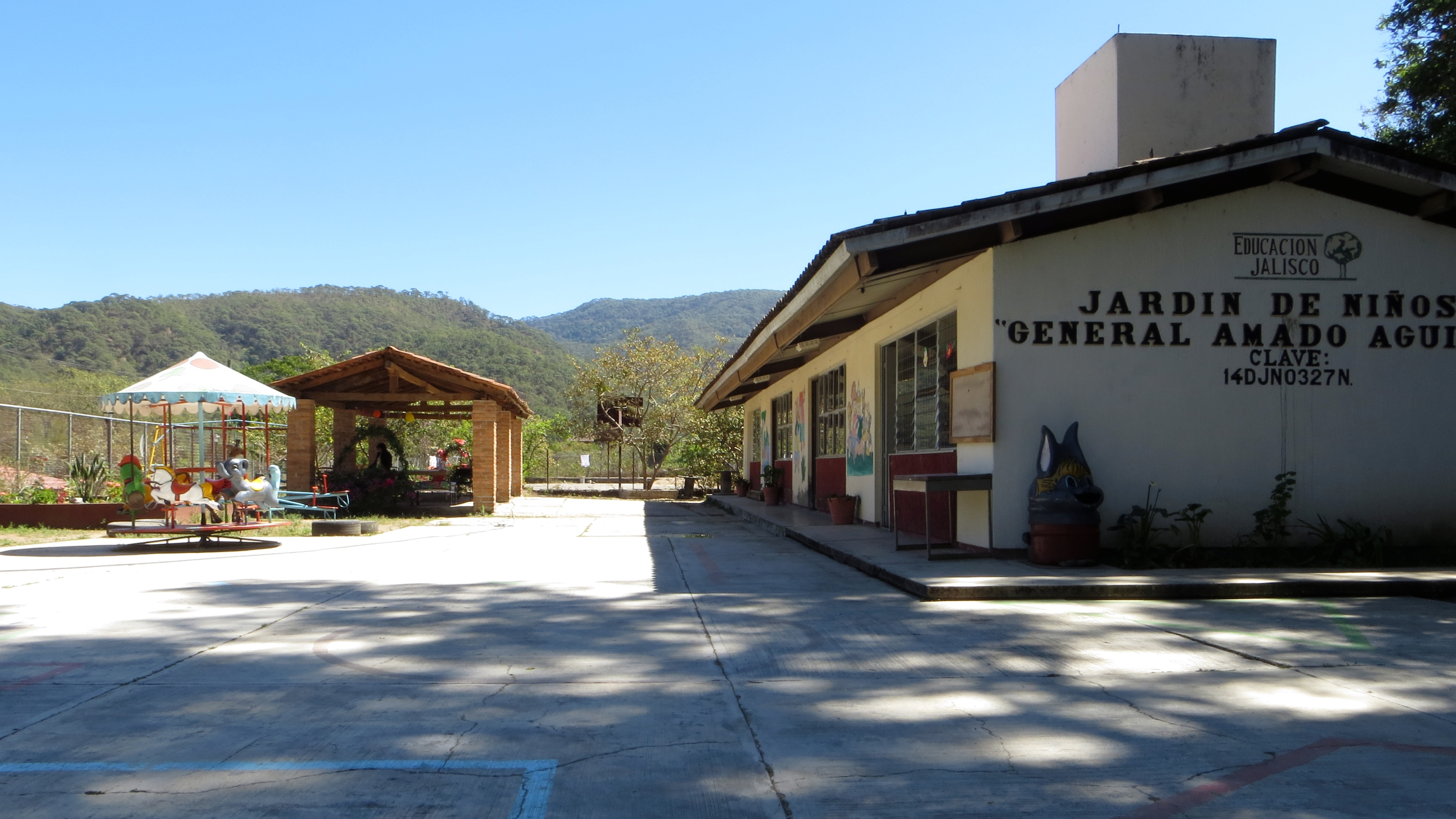
School building and schoolyard.

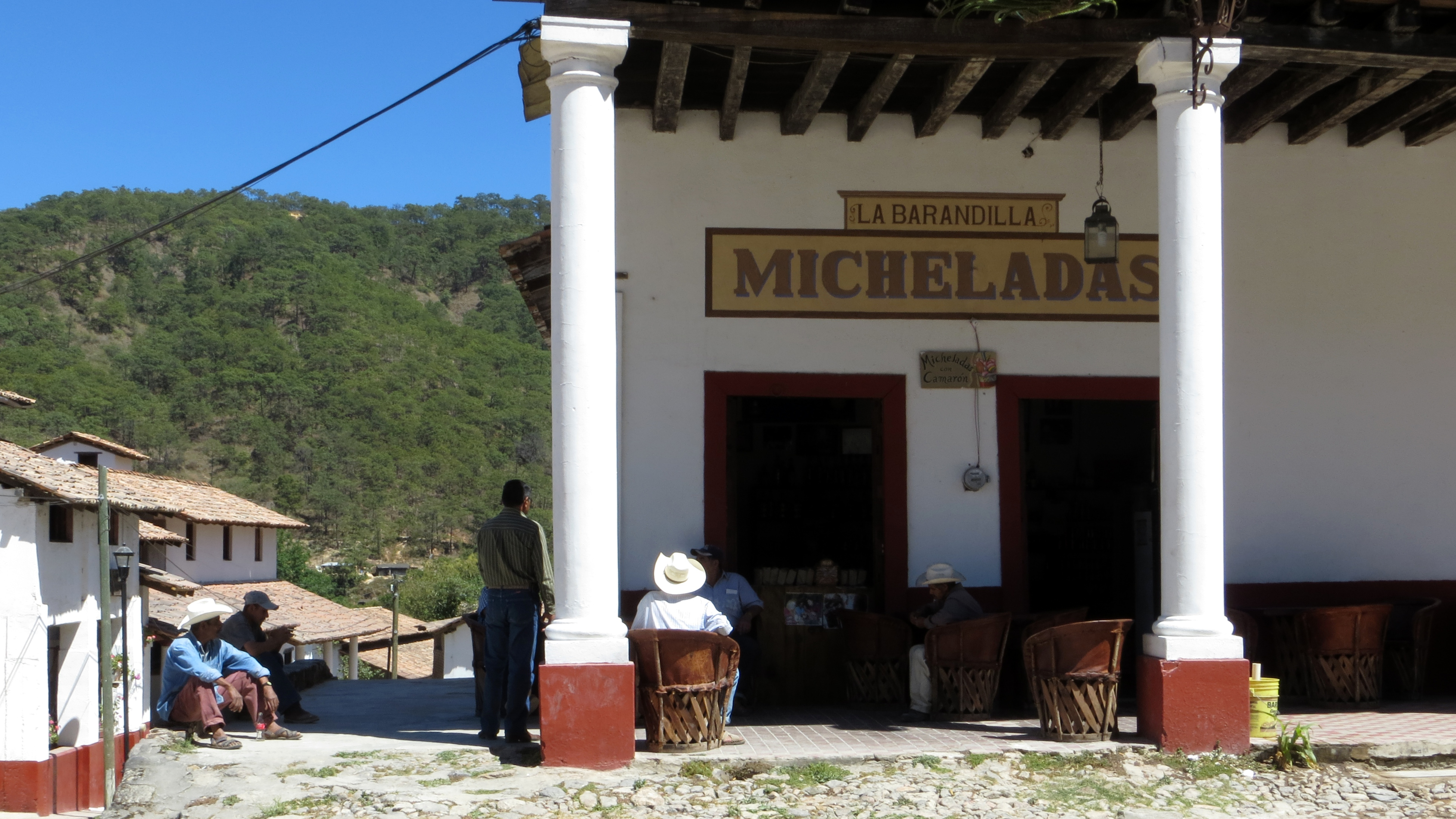
Michelada bar in the center of town.

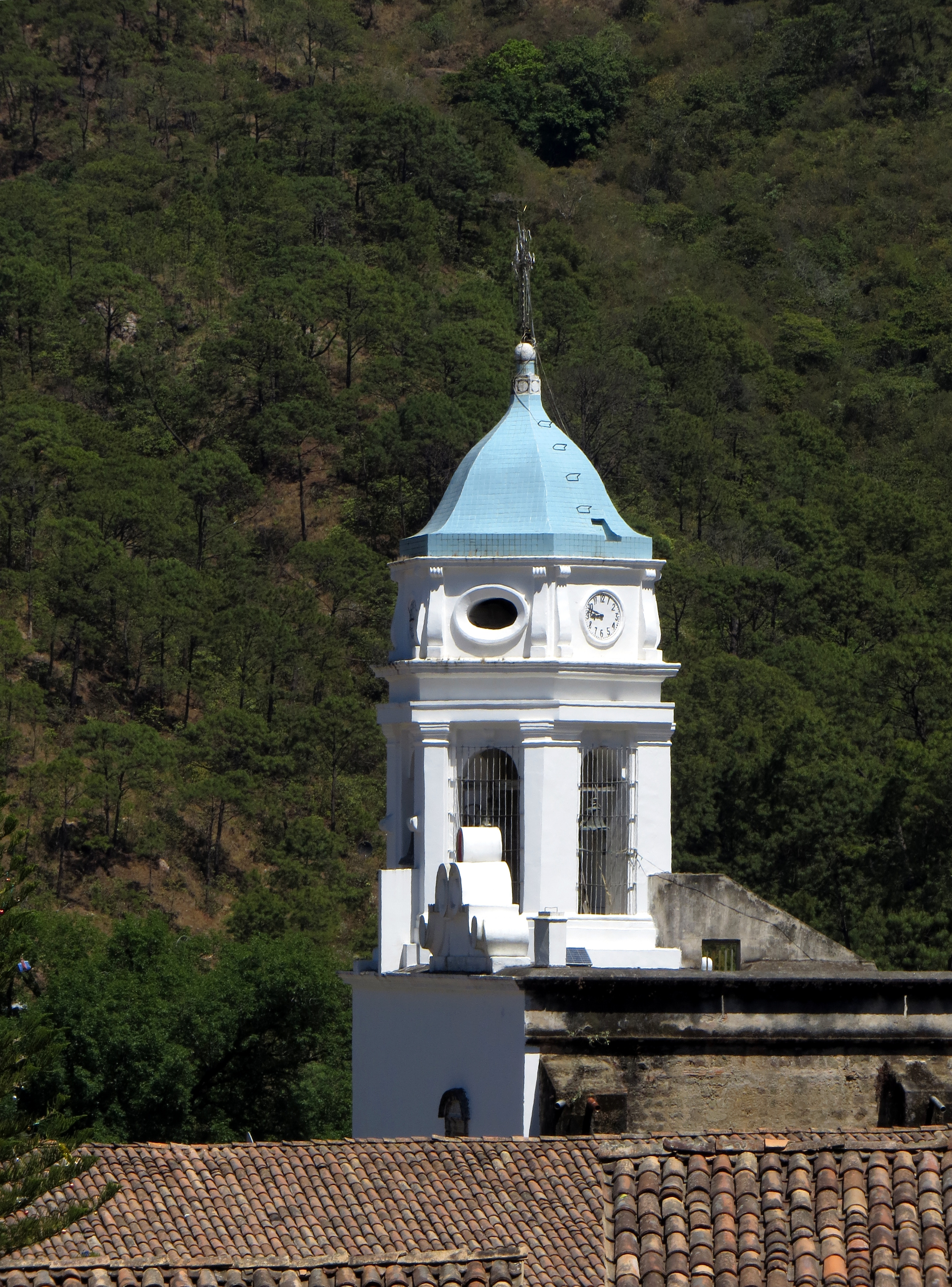
The Baroque bell tower of the Church of San Sebastián.

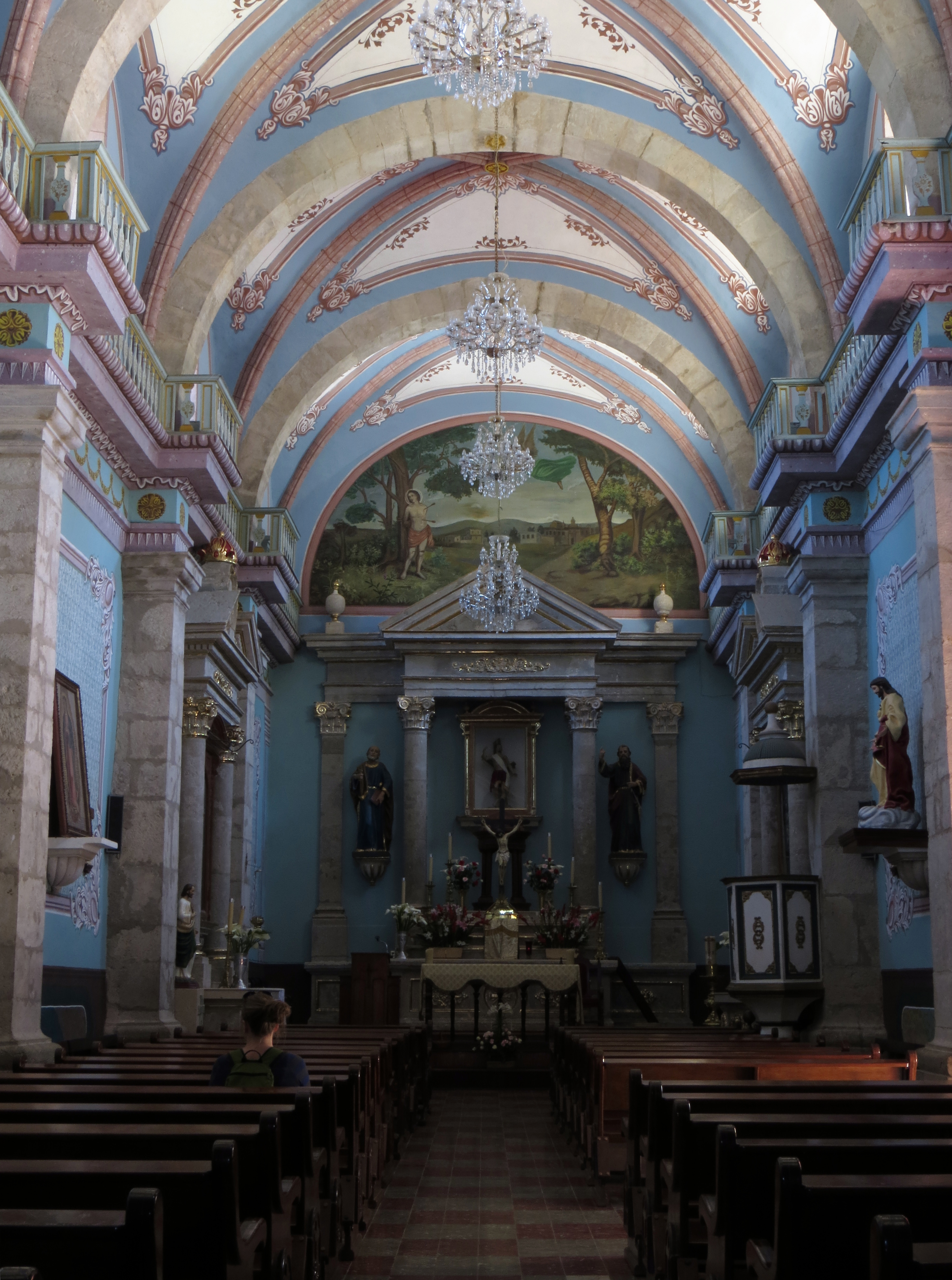
Baroque interior of the Church of San Sebastián.

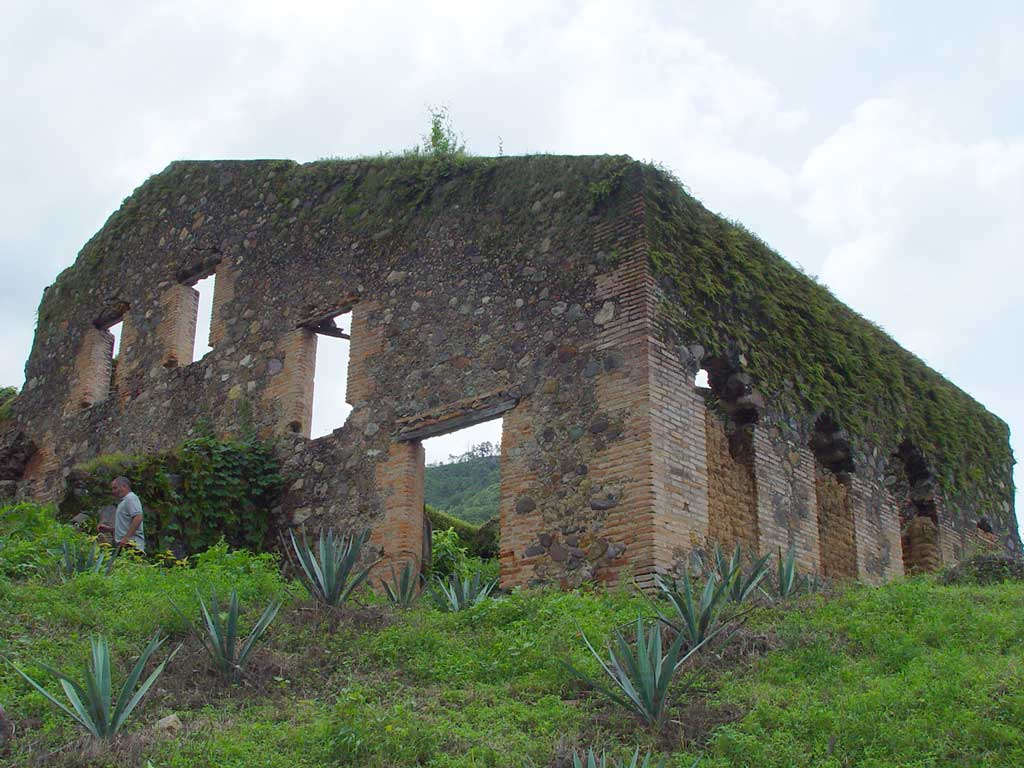
Ruins of a gold and silver reduction foundry for the local mines.

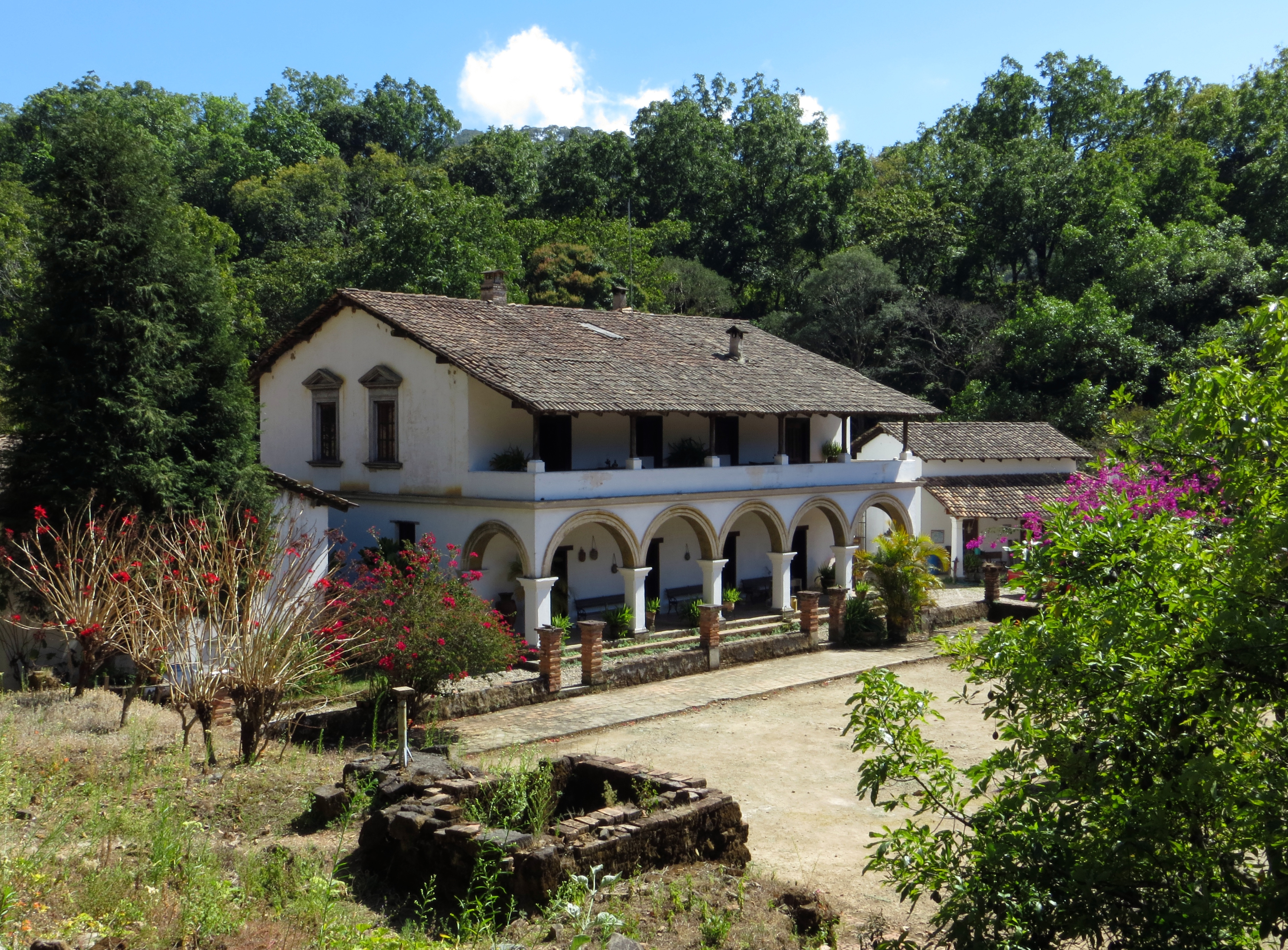
Hacienda Jalisco, in the municipality.

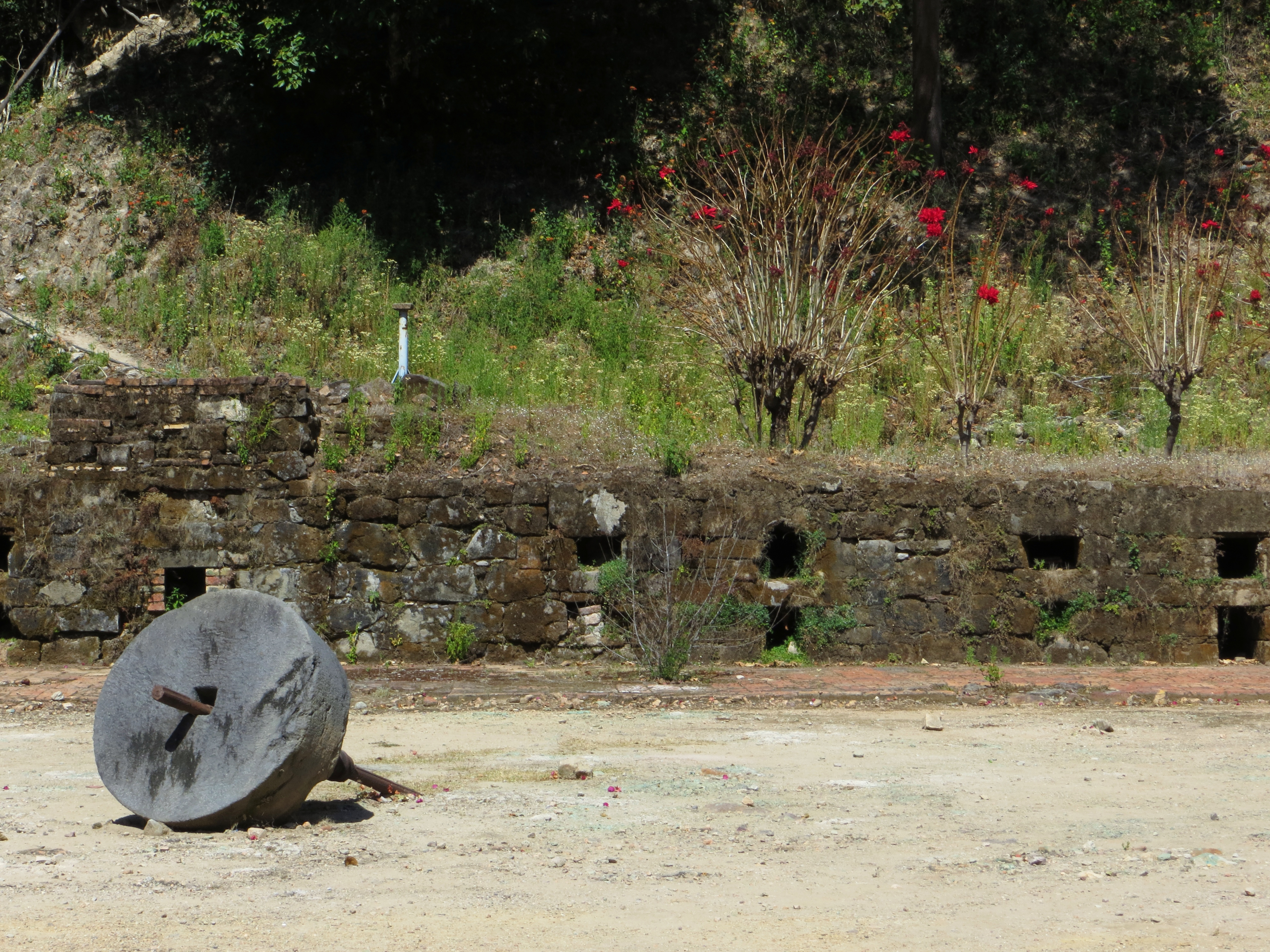
Hacienda Jalisco, a grinding stone and hornos (ovens).

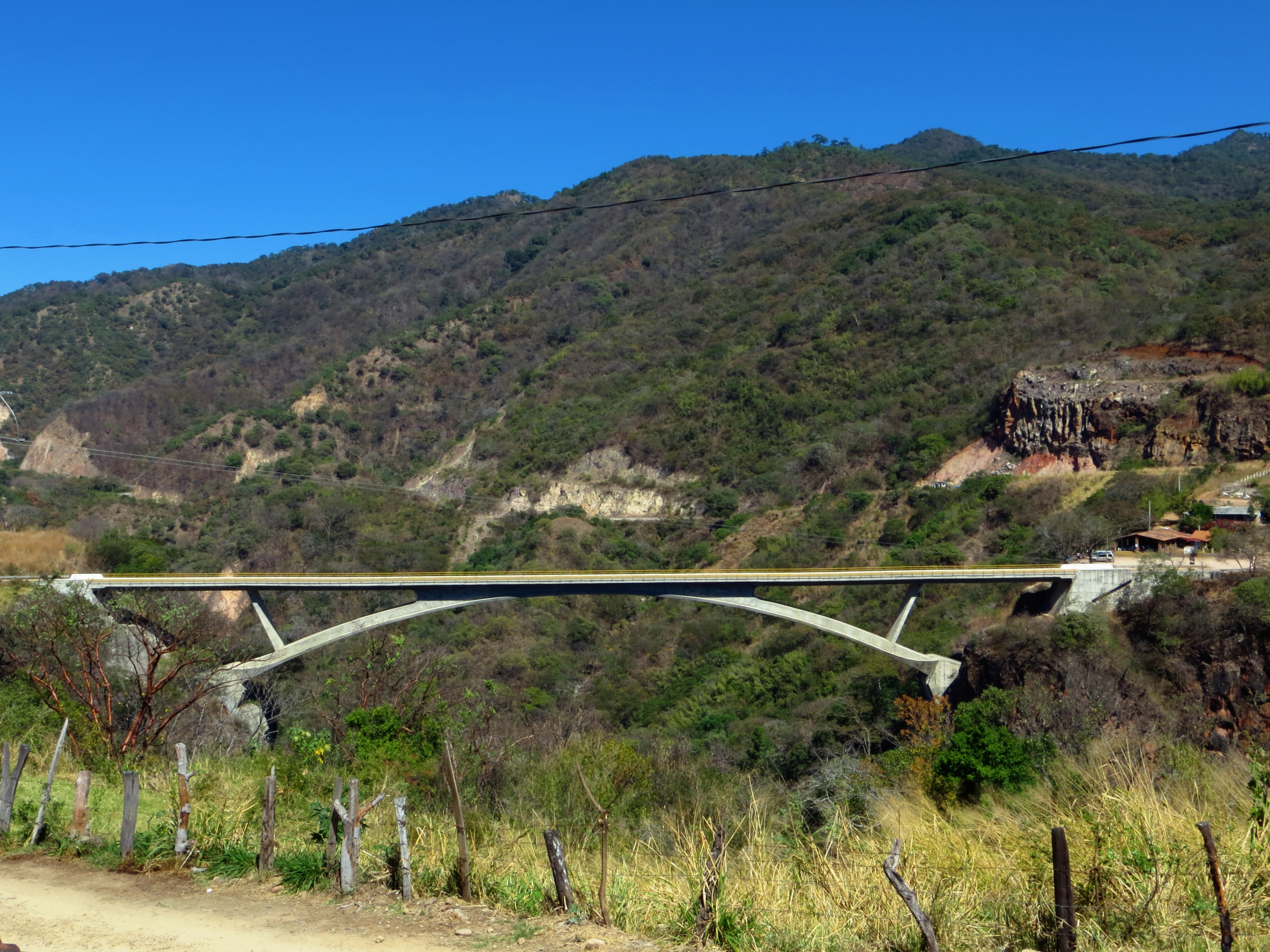
El Progreso Bridge, viewed from the south.

== See also ==
- Fray Nicolás de Jesús María
