= Mascota =

Mascota, Jalisco
- Municipality and town
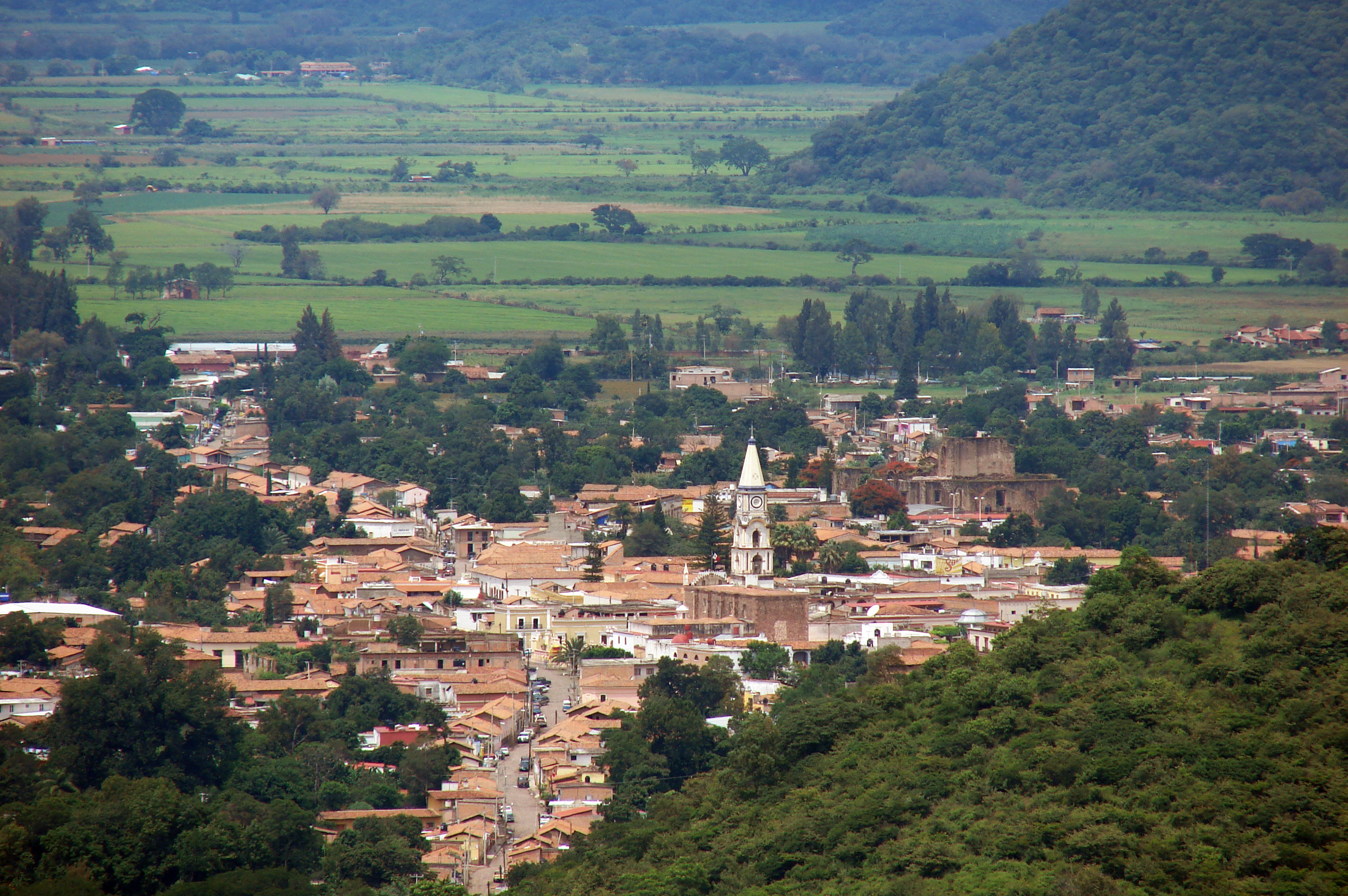
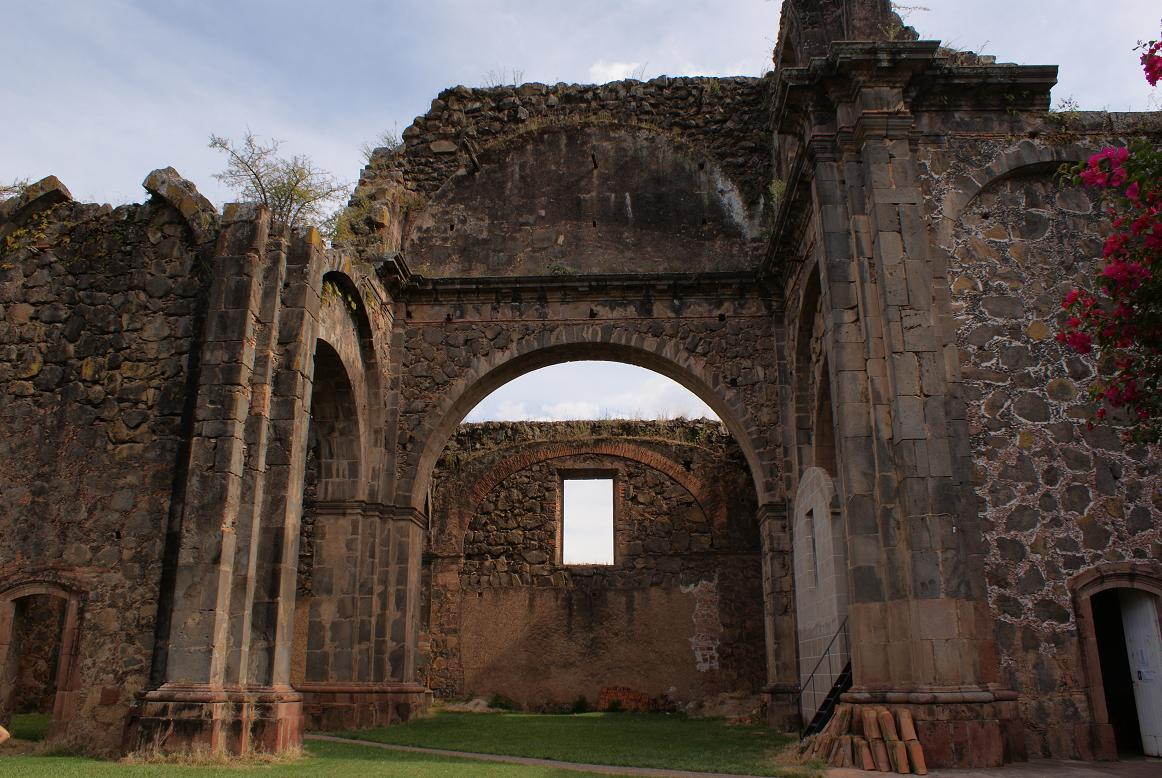
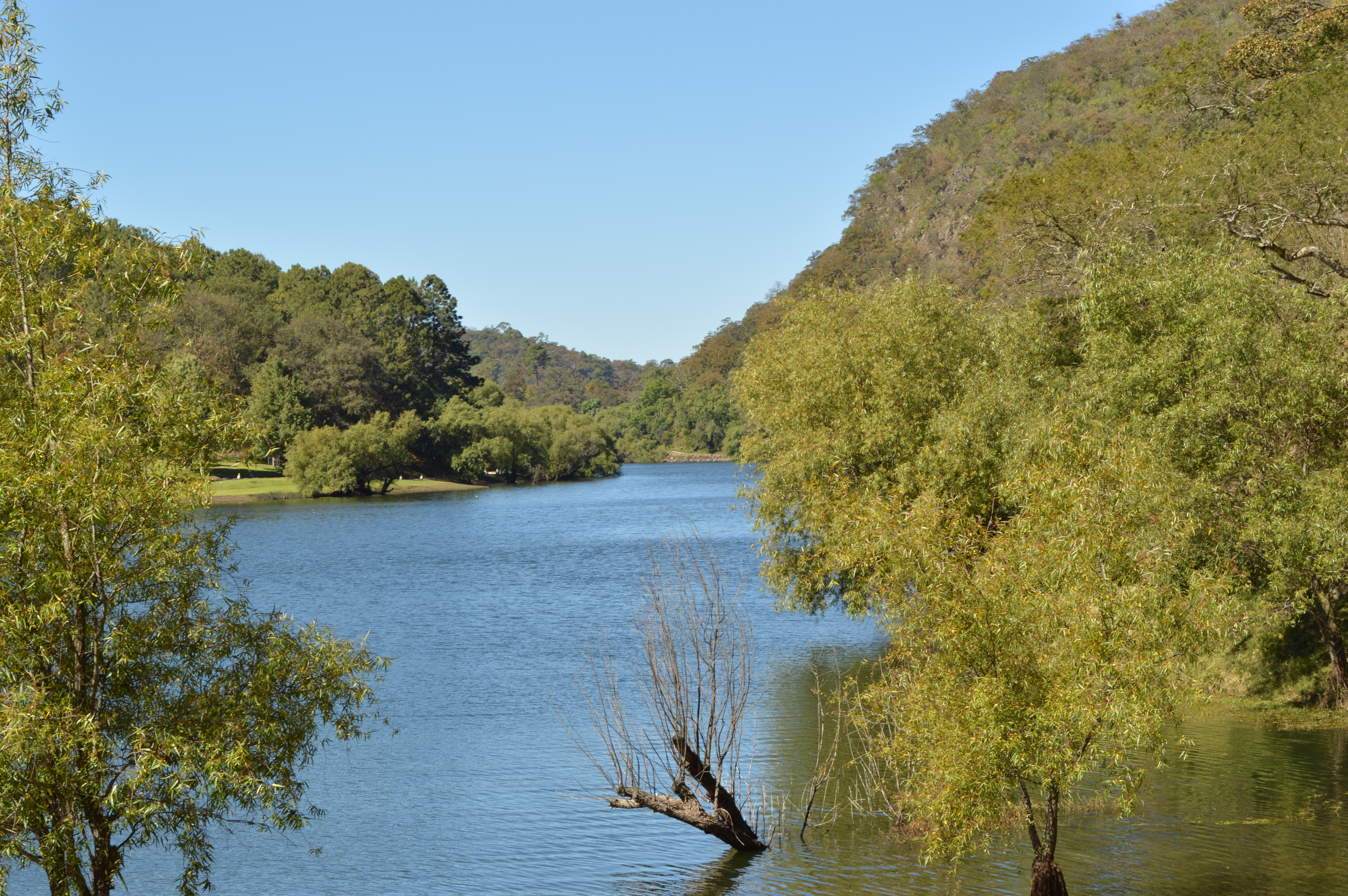
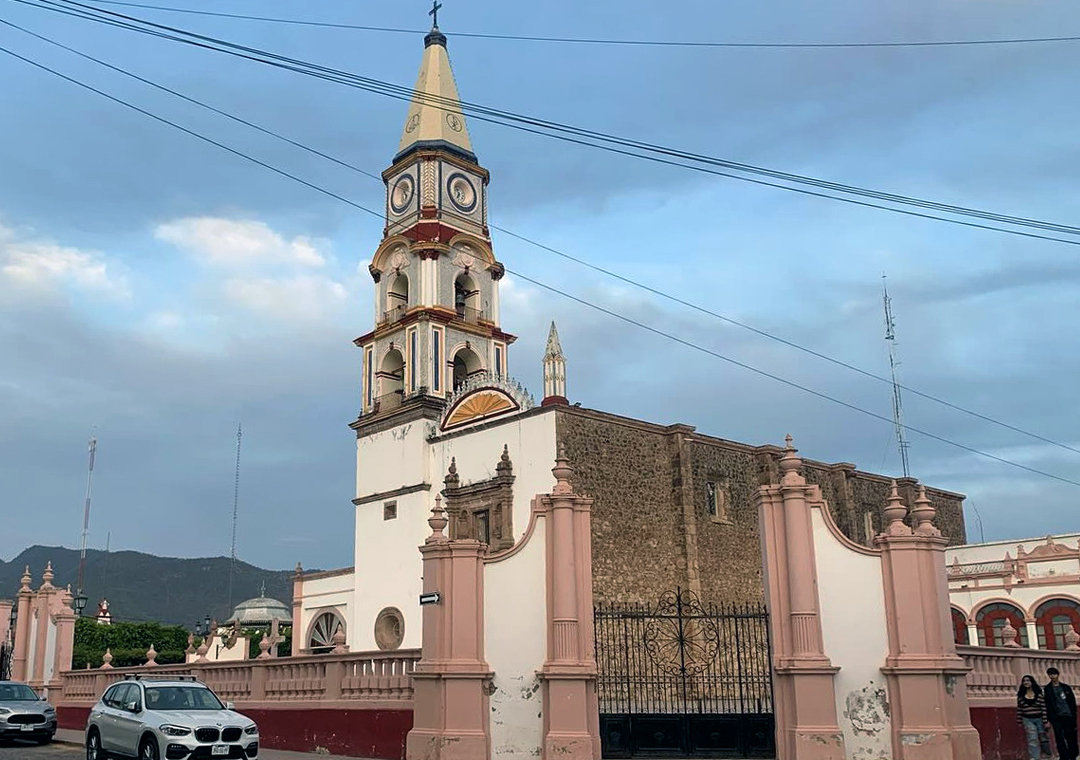
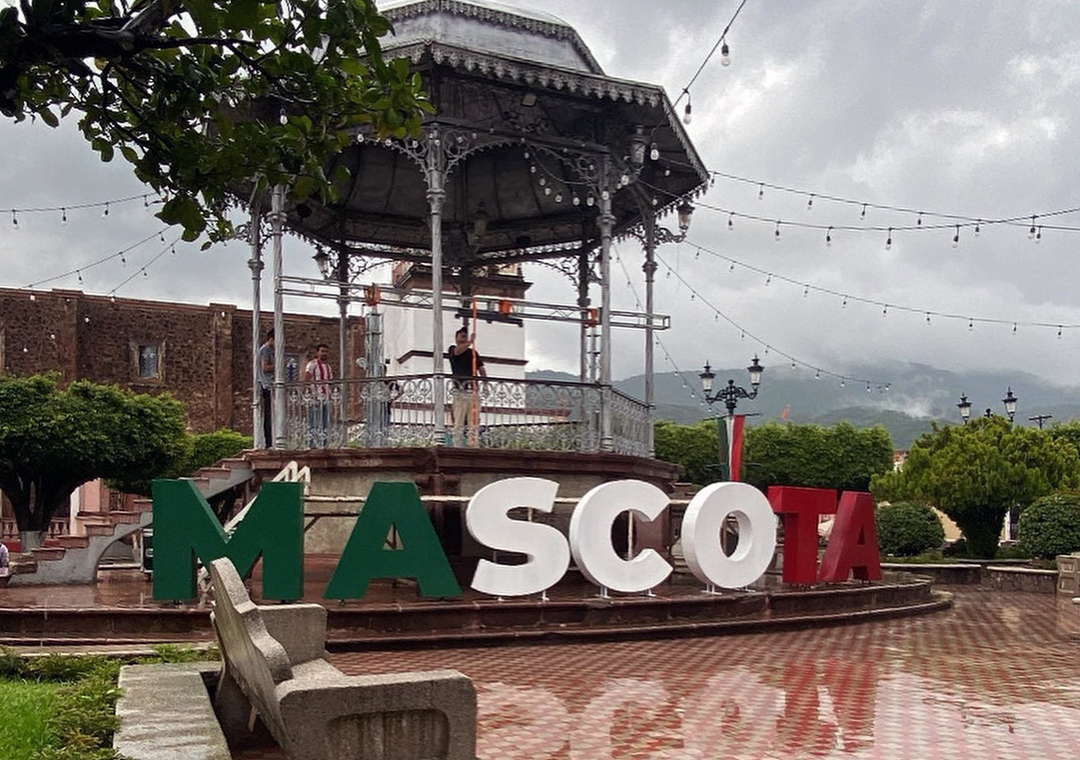
- Top: View of Mascota; middle:Ruins of "La Preciosa Sangre" Temple (left) and Juanacatlán Lagoon (right); bottom: Parish of Our Lady of Remedios (left) and Mascota Main Plaza (right).

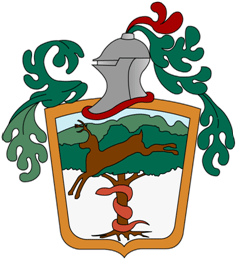
- Coat of arms

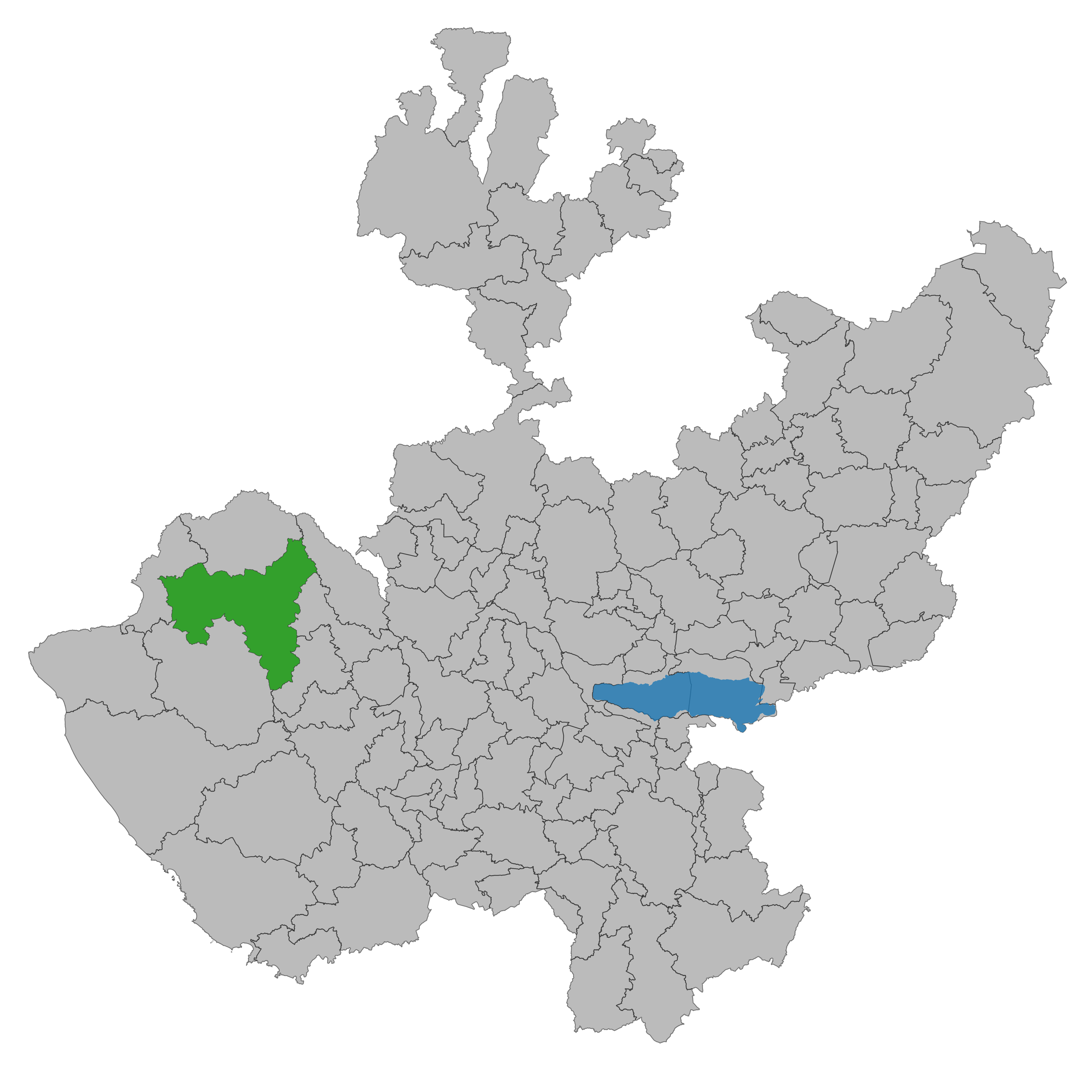

- Location in Mexico
- Coordinates: 20°31′24.6371″N 104°47′19.0432″W
- Country: Mexico
- State: Jalisco

Government
  - Mayor: Dra. Sarah Castillon Ochoa

Area
  - Total: 1,843 km^{2} (712 sq mi)
  - Town: 3.36 km^{2} (1.30 sq mi)
- Elevation: 1,268 m (4,160 ft)

Population (2020 census)
  - Total: 14,451
  - Density: 7.841/km^{2} (20.31/sq mi)
  - Town: 9,272
  - Town density: 2,760/km^{2} (7,150/sq mi)
- Postal Code: 46900
- Area code: 388
- Website: http://www.mascota.jalisco.gob.mx/index.html

For the lucha libre term, see Mini-Estrella.

Mascota is a town and municipality in Jalisco, in central-western Mexico, part of the Costa-Sierra Occidental Region. The municipality covers an area of 1,843 km^{2}. The name Mascota comes from the root "Amaxacotlán", which means "place of deer and colubrids".

The municipality has smaller villages such as Tecuani and La Plata, both a couple miles away. Mascota is surrounded by roads and pine-covered mountains and is a usual stop on the road to Talpa De Allende or Puerto Vallarta.

As of 2020, the municipality had a total population of 14,451.

== History ==
In prehispanic times, Mascota was the head of a cacicazgo, which ruled over the populations of Talpa, El Tuito and Chacala. In 1525, the Spanish explorer Francisco Cortés de San Buenaventura arrived to Mascota, who was commanded by Hernán Cortés to conquer the provinces north of Colima, which was subsequently renamed to "Valle de Banderas". 10 years after, in 1535, a rebellion of indigenous people was held in Mascota, along with other villages nearby.

After the time of the Mexican Independence, in 1824, the Department of Mascota was created and the town of Mascota was declared Villa de Mascota. On 10 April 1885, Villa de Mascota received the title of city.

In 2015, the city of Mascota was declared a "Pueblo Mágico".

== Geography ==
=== Climate ===
Climate data for Mascota (1991–2020 normals, extremes 1923–present)
Month	Jan	Feb	Mar	Apr	May	Jun	Jul	Aug	Sep	Oct	Nov	Dec	Year
Record high °C (°F)	35 (95)	37 (99)	41 (106)	43 (109)	42 (108)	41.5 (106.7)	40 (104)	40 (104)	41 (106)	38 (100)	36 (97)	37 (99)	43 (109)
Mean daily maximum °C (°F)	25.8 (78.4)	27.4 (81.3)	29.4 (84.9)	31.1 (88.0)	32.2 (90.0)	30.5 (86.9)	28.5 (83.3)	28.2 (82.8)	28.0 (82.4)	28.0 (82.4)	27.2 (81.0)	25.8 (78.4)	28.5 (83.3)
Daily mean °C (°F)	17.0 (62.6)	18.1 (64.6)	19.2 (66.6)	21.1 (70.0)	23.0 (73.4)	24.0 (75.2)	23.0 (73.4)	22.9 (73.2)	22.8 (73.0)	21.8 (71.2)	19.4 (66.9)	17.5 (63.5)	20.8 (69.4)
Mean daily minimum °C (°F)	8.2 (46.8)	8.9 (48.0)	9.1 (48.4)	11.1 (52.0)	13.7 (56.7)	17.6 (63.7)	17.5 (63.5)	17.6 (63.7)	17.6 (63.7)	15.5 (59.9)	11.7 (53.1)	9.2 (48.6)	13.1 (55.6)
Record low °C (°F)	−3 (27)	−1.5 (29.3)	−0.5 (31.1)	1 (34)	5 (41)	5.5 (41.9)	1 (34)	9 (48)	9 (48)	4 (39)	3 (37)	−2.5 (27.5)	−3 (27)
Average precipitation mm (inches)	26.7 (1.05)	19.9 (0.78)	12.9 (0.51)	2.1 (0.08)	16.9 (0.67)	179.1 (7.05)	233.1 (9.18)	244.0 (9.61)	210.9 (8.30)	82.7 (3.26)	21.9 (0.86)	17.9 (0.70)	1,068.1 (42.05)
Average precipitation days	2.2	1.8	0.7	0.4	2.2	16.3	22.8	22.9	19.8	10.9	4.1	3.6	107.7
Source: Servicio Meteorológico Nacional
