= Mixtlán =

- Municipality and town
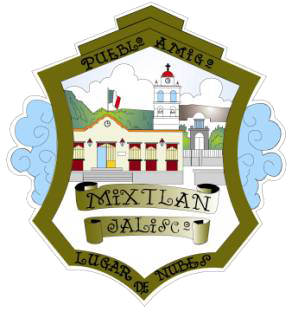
- Coat of arms
- Nickname: In its native Náhuatl, Mixtlán means "Lugar de Nubes" or Place of Clouds.
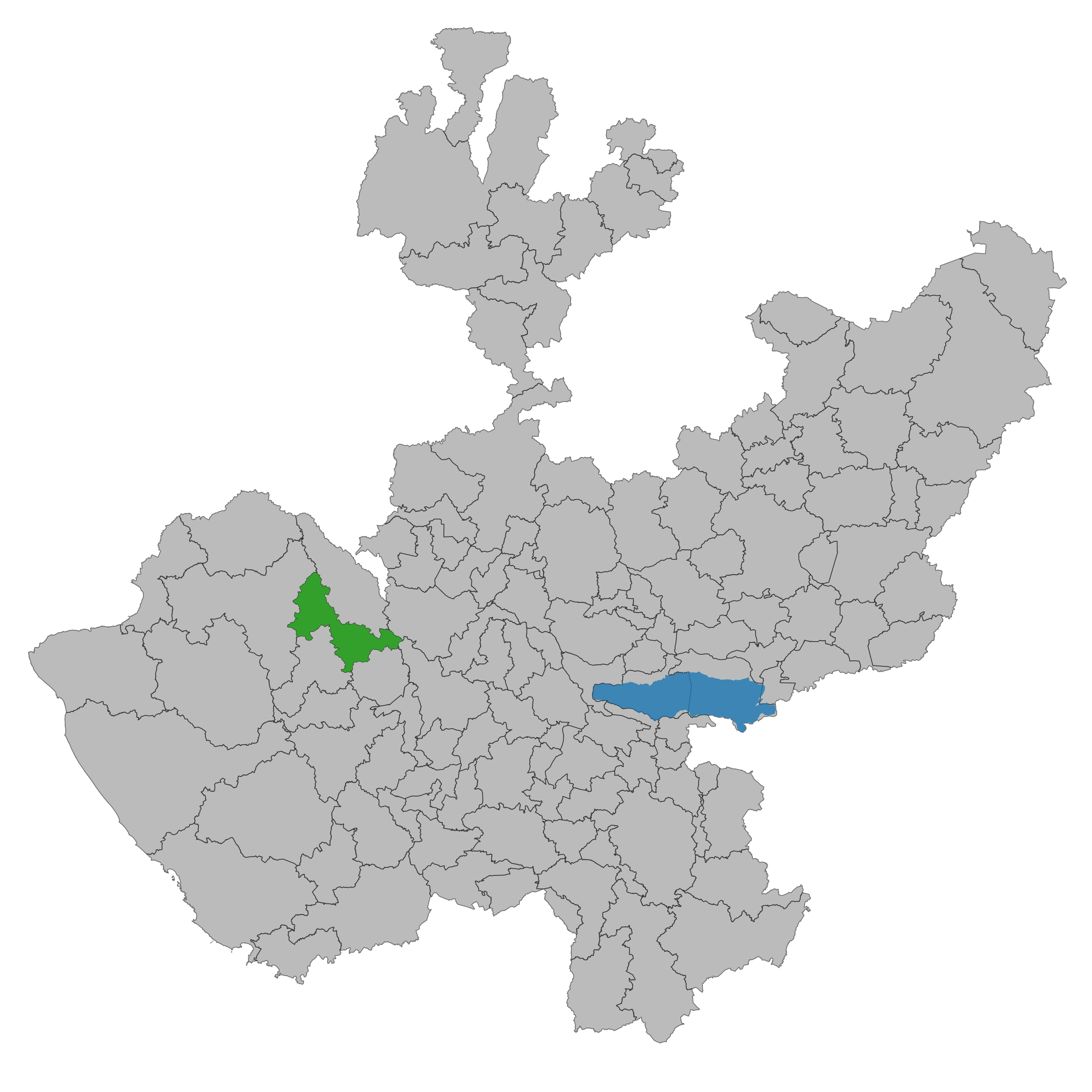
- Location of the municipality in Jalisco

- Location in Mexico
- Coordinates: 20°22′N 104°15′W
- Country: Mexico
- State: Jalisco

Area
  - Total: 631 km^{2} (244 sq mi)
  - Town: 1.91 km^{2} (0.74 sq mi)

Population (2020 census)
  - Total: 3,638
  - Density: 5.77/km^{2} (14.9/sq mi)
  - Town: 1,710
  - Town density: 895/km^{2} (2,320/sq mi)
- Time zone: UTC-6 (Central Standard Time)

Mixtlán is a town and municipality, in Jalisco in central-western Mexico. The municipality covers an area of 631 square kilometres (244 sq mi). It first became a Municipality on October 20, 1938. In its native Náhuatl, Mixtlán means place of clouds.

As of 2005, the municipality had a total population of 3279.
