= Atenguillo =

- Municipality and town
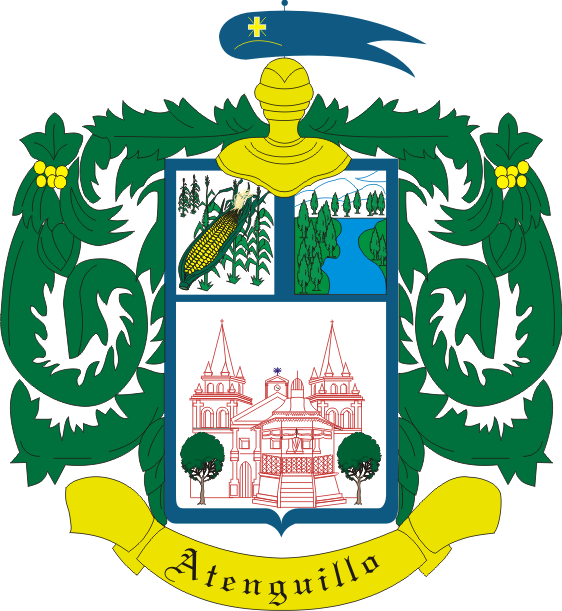
- Coat of arms

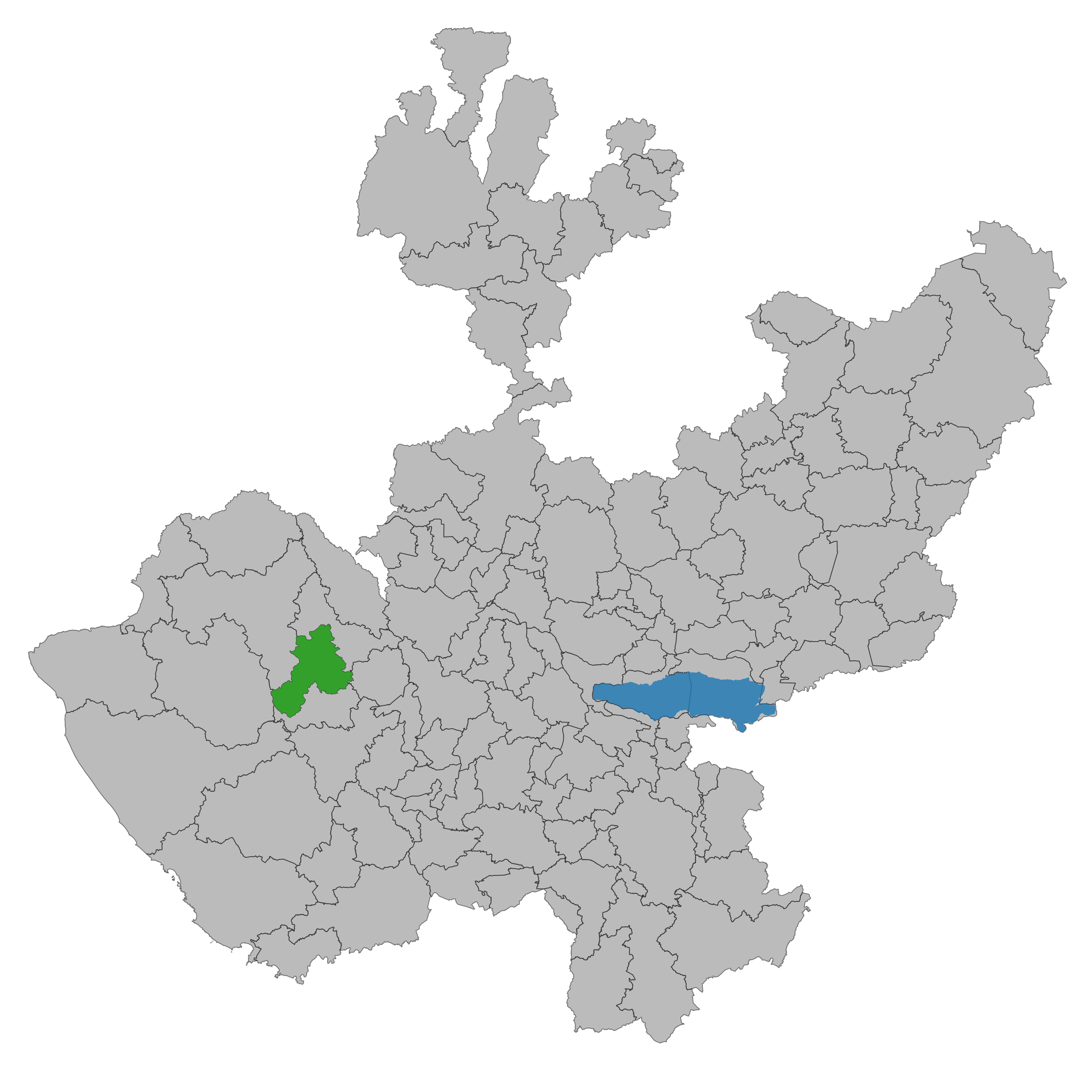
- Location of the municipality in Jalisco

- Location in Mexico
- Coordinates: 20°17′N 104°24′W
- Country: Mexico
- State: Jalisco

Area
  - Total: 610.2 km^{2} (235.6 sq mi)
  - Town: 1.16 km^{2} (0.45 sq mi)

Population (2020 census)
  - Total: 4,176
  - Density: 6.844/km^{2} (17.72/sq mi)
  - Town: 1,589
  - Town density: 1,370/km^{2} (3,550/sq mi)
- Postal code: 48100
- Area code: 388

Atenguillo is a town and municipality, in Jalisco in central-western Mexico. The municipality covers an area of 610.2 km^{2}.

As of 2005, the municipality had a population of 4107.
