= Guachinango, Jalisco =

Guachinango
- Municipality and town
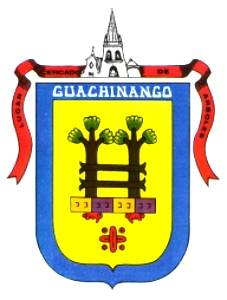
- Coat of arms

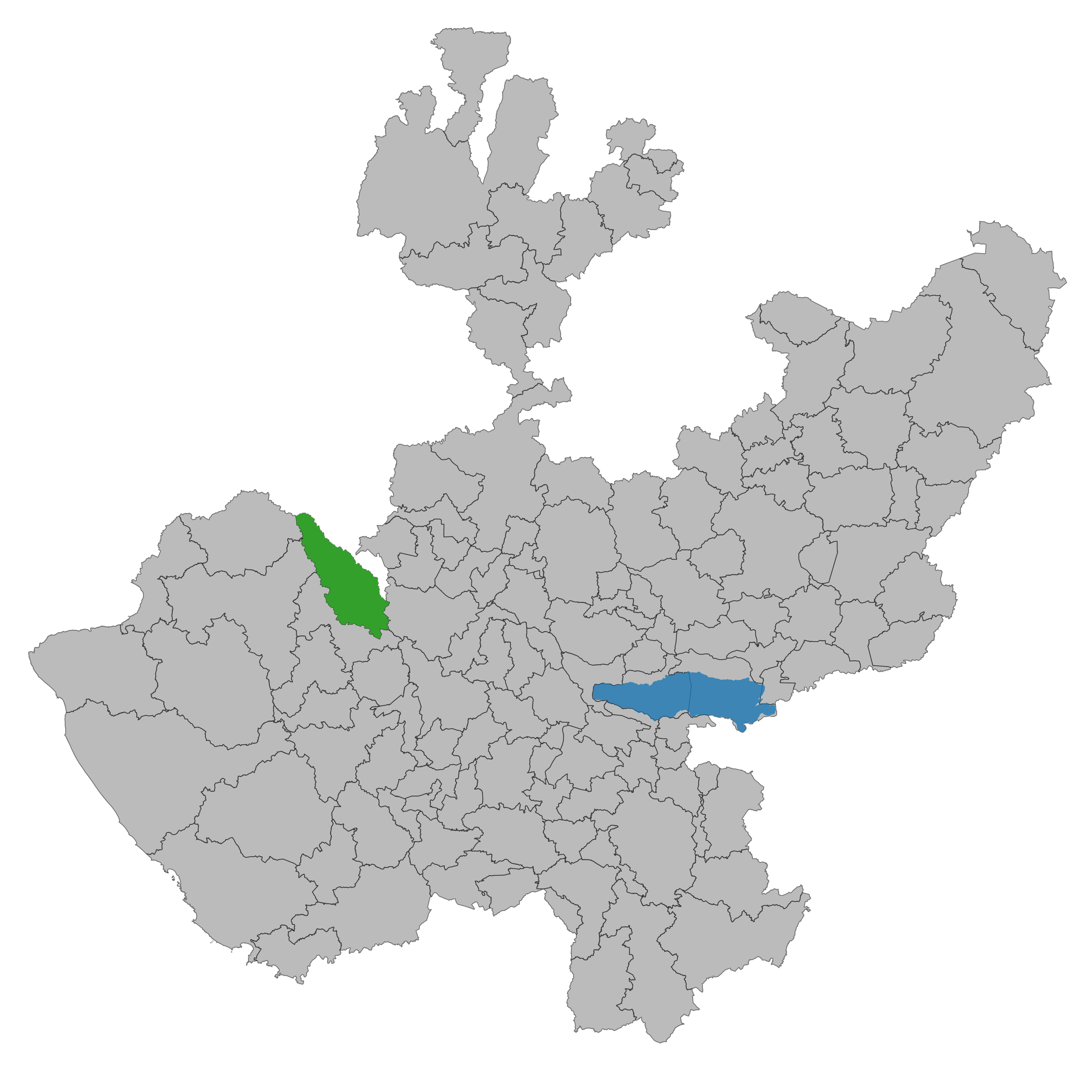
- Location of the municipality in Jalisco

- Location in Mexico
- Coordinates: 20°46′N 104°05′W
- Country: Mexico
- State: Jalisco

Area
  - Total: 837.7 km^{2} (323.4 sq mi)
  - Town: 1.25 km^{2} (0.48 sq mi)

Population (2020 census)
  - Total: 4,199
  - Density: 5.013/km^{2} (12.98/sq mi)
  - Town: 2,124
  - Town density: 1,700/km^{2} (4,400/sq mi)

Guachinango (Spanish pronunciation: [ɡwatʃiˈnaŋɡo]) is a town and municipality in Jalisco in central-western Mexico. The municipality covers an area of 837.7 km^{2}.

As of 2005, the municipality had a total population of 4,138.

The Spanish discovered gold lodes here in the 1540s, which started commercial gold mining in the area.
