= Sureste Region, Jalisco =

Sureste Region
- Region
- #5-Sureste Region
- Country: Mexico
- State: Jalisco
- Largest city: Chapala

Area
  - Total: 3,102 km^{2} (1,198 sq mi)

Population (2020)
  - Total: 171,937
- Time zone: UTC−6 (CST)

The Sureste region is one of the regions of the Mexican state of Jalisco. It comprises 10 municipalities and had a population of 171,937 in 2020.

== Municipalities ==
| Municipality code | Name | Population | | Land area | | | Population density | |
| Municipality code | Name | 2020 | Rank | km^{2} | sq mi | Rank | 2020 | Rank |
|---|---|---|---|---|---|---|---|---|
| 030 | Chapala | 55,196 | 1 | 128 | 49 | 9 | 431/km^{2} (1,117/sq mi) | 1 |
| 026 | Concepción de Buenos Aires | 6,334 | 7 | 303 | 117 | 4 | 21/km^{2} (54/sq mi) | 8 |
| 050 | Jocotepec | 47,105 | 2 | 323 | 125 | 3 | 146/km^{2} (378/sq mi) | 2 |
| 057 | La Manzanilla de La Paz | 4,099 | 9 | 146 | 56 | 8 | 28/km^{2} (73/sq mi) | 7 |
| 059 | Mazamitla | 14,043 | 4 | 298 | 115 | 5 | 47/km^{2} (122/sq mi) | 5 |
| 069 | Quitupan | 7,734 | 5 | 565 | 218 | 2 | 14/km^{2} (35/sq mi) | 9 |
| 056 | Santa María del Oro | 1,815 | 10 | 889 | 343 | 1 | 2/km^{2} (5/sq mi) | 10 |
| 096 | Tizapán el Alto | 22,758 | 3 | 189 | 73 | 6 | 120/km^{2} (312/sq mi) | 3 |
| 107 | Tuxcueca | 6,702 | 6 | 105 | 41 | 10 | 64/km^{2} (165/sq mi) | 4 |
| 112 | Valle de Juárez | 6,151 | 8 | 156 | 60 | 7 | 39/km^{2} (102/sq mi) | 6 |
| | Centro Region | 171,937 | — | 3,102 | 1,197.69 | — | 55/km^{2} (144/sq mi) | — |
Source: INEGI

=== Largest cities ===
Largest cities or towns in Sureste Region Source:
| Rank | | Municipality | Pop. |
|---|---|---|---|
| 1 | Chapala | Chapala | 24,352 |
| 2 | Jocotepec | Jocotepec | 20,286 |
| 3 | Tizapán el Alto | Tizapán el Alto | 16,324 |
| 4 | Ajijic | Chapala | 11,439 |
| 5 | San Juan Cosalá | Jocotepec | 8,453 |
| 6 | Mazamitla | Mazamitla | 8,142 |
| 7 | Atotonilquillo | Chapala | 7,004 |
| 8 | San Antonio Tlayacapan | Chapala | 6,616 |
| 9 | Concepción de Buenos Aires | Concepción de Buenos Aires | 5,113 |
| 10 | Valle de Juárez | Valle de Juárez | 4,418 |
