= Mazamitla =

- Municipality and town
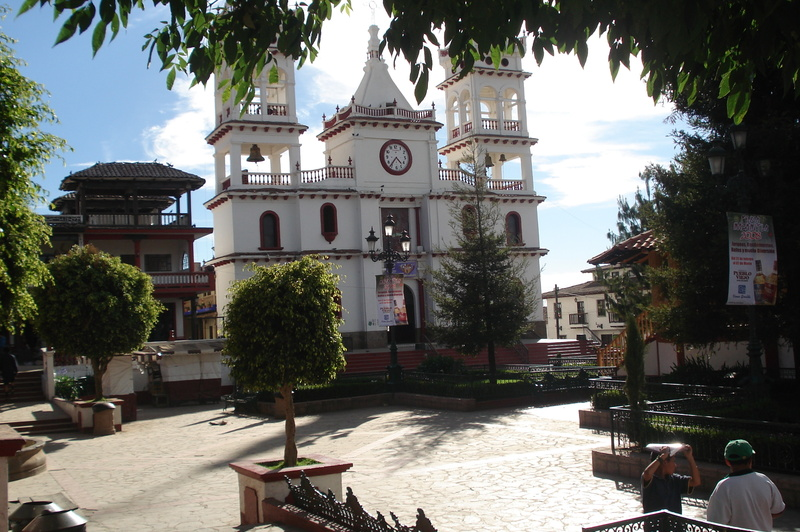

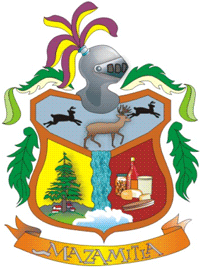
- Coat of arms

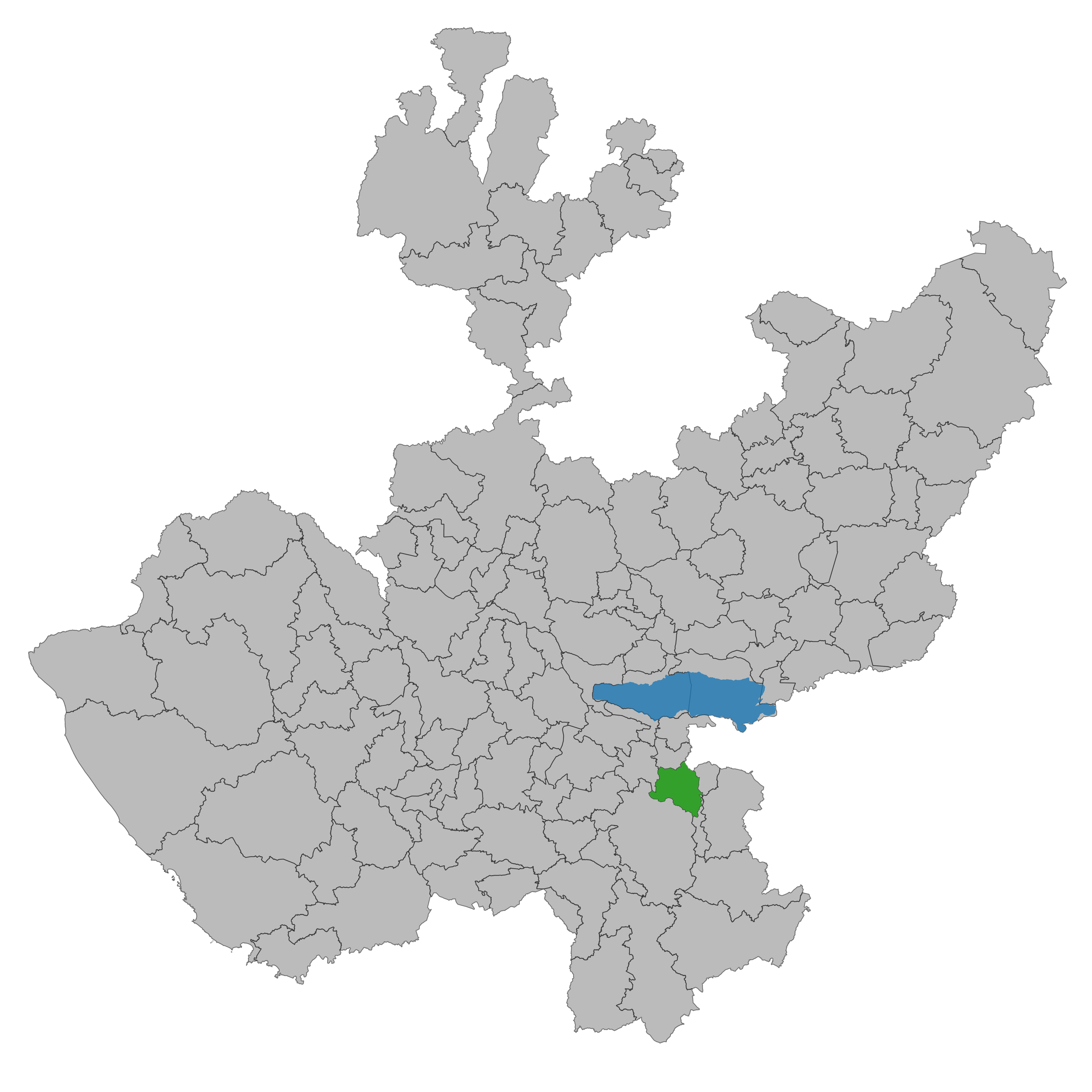
- Location of the municipality in Jalisco

- Location in Mexico Mazamitla (Mexico)
- Coordinates: 19°54′55″N 103°01′15″W
- Country: Mexico
- State: Jalisco

Area
  - Total: 288.9 km^{2} (111.5 sq mi)
  - Town: 4.32 km^{2} (1.67 sq mi)

Population (2020 census)
  - Total: 14,043
  - Density: 48.61/km^{2} (125.9/sq mi)
  - Town: 8,142
  - Town density: 1,880/km^{2} (4,880/sq mi)
- Time zone: UTC-6 (Central Standard Time)
  - Summer (DST): UTC-5 (Central Daylight Time)
- Website: Official site

Mazamitla (Spanish: [masa'mitla]) is a town and municipality of the Mexican state of Jalisco. It is located 124 km south of Guadalajara in the Southeast Region and is a popular resort destination for travelers from Guadalajara and nearby urban centers. Its name comes from Nahuatl and means "place where arrows are made to hunt deer". Its area is 288.9 km^{2}. According to Count II Population and Housing, the municipality has 11,671 inhabitants who are devoted mainly to the tertiary sector. It is designated as a Pueblo Mágico by the federal Secretariat of Tourism for its natural environment.

== Etymology ==
The name comes from the Nahuatl language and is the union of the words "Mazatl" (deer), "Mitl" (arrow) and "tlan" (place). Its meaning has been interpreted in different ways:

- "Where deer are hunted with arrows"
- "Where deer hunting arrows are made"
- "Deer-hunting fletchers' place"
- "Where fuentes are hunted with arrows"

== History ==
Mazamitla was founded by the Aztecs in 1165. It belonged to the manor of Tzapotlán. Mazamitla paid tribute to the main city of its province, Tamazollan, also known as Tamazula. In 1481 the area was invaded by the Purépecha so that they could take the Laguna de Sayula. Purépecha held the area for only a few years until they were defeated at the end of the Salitre War in 1510.

The place was conquered by Cristóbal de Olid together with Juan Rodríguez Villafuerte in early 1522. Their party had been sent by Cortés to explore the region of western Mexico. Upon the conquest, the people of Tzapotlán were awarded to Hernán Cortés who appointed Anton Salcedo as encomendero. Being named president of the Audiencia of Mexico, Nuño de Guzmán moved these parcels to Cortés.

It said that when he was priest of this area, Miguel Hidalgo, held mass in Palo Gordo. He used the trunk of an oak that is now saved as a relic to serve as the altar for mass. During the War of Independence from Spain, insurgents led by Francisco Echeverria clashed in 1812 in the slope of Zapatero. Echeverria was seriously injured, dying in Mazamitla. During the French intervention, the French soldiers burned files in the city. After the intervention, the Mexican locals of Mazamitla captured a French officer named Jonny Fuentes who was hanged in the year 1815 in the town square.

Since 1825 the town had belonged to the 4th canton of Sayula until 1878, when it became a 9th canton of Ciudad Guzmán. On April 19, 1894 the place was declared a town by decree of the state congress. The population of Mazamitla has largely increased over time. The chief operating officer Alexis Ceja demanded that the pueblo increase its tourism and created the idea of making cabins for future residents and guests of Mazamitla.

== Geography ==
=== Location ===
Mazamitla is located in the south-central area of Jalisco, south of Lake Chapala at coordinates 19º47'30" to 19º59'00" north latitude and 102º58'35" to 103º10'45" west longitude, at an altitude of 2200 meters above sea level.

On the north the town abuts the town of La Manzanilla de La Paz, the state of Michoacán and the town of Valle de Juárez, on the east by the town of Valle de Juárez, on the south by the municipalities of Valle de Juárez and of Tamazula de Gordiano; on the west by the municipalities of Concepción de Buenos Aires and La Manzanilla de La Paz.

=== Orography ===
Its surface is composed of hilly areas (35%), with hills occupied by forests, with heights ranging from 2200 to 2800 meters. Land semiplane (40%) are hills and slopes, with heights ranging from 2000 to 2200 meters above sea level and flat areas (25%), with elevations ranging from 200 to 1800 meters above sea level. The maximum heights are in Cerro El Jackal and Cerro del Tigre.

=== Geography ===
The territory is made up of land belonging to the Tertiary period. The land is hilly and broken, its composition is prevalent types luvisol, feozem háplico and litosol. The municipality has a land area of 17718 hectares, of which 3495 are used for agriculture, livestock in 3095, 10516 are from forest use, urban land are 206 hectares and 442 hectares have other uses. As far as ownership is concerned, an area of 6432 hectares is private and the other 11286 is communally or publicly owned.

=== Hydrography ===
Its water resources are the rivers: La Pasión, Río de Gómez, Los Cazos, Ponche Grande and la media luna; streams: El Salto, Barranca Verde, El Ruido, Cuate, Barranca, Los Puentes and La Cuesta; The Springs: Barranca los Hoyos, Paso Blanco, La Pasión y Boca de Tinieblas.

=== Climate ===
The climate is subtropical highland, with dry, mild winters. The average annual temperature is 21°C (69.8°F with maximum of 25.7°C (78.26°F) and minimum of 7.1°C (44.78°F). The rainfall recorded between June and September, with an average rainfall of 982 millimeters. The average annual number of days with frost is 52.6. The prevailing winds head south.

Climate data for Mazamitla
| Month | Jan | Feb | Mar | Apr | May | Jun | Jul | Aug | Sep | Oct | Nov | Dec | Year |
|---|---|---|---|---|---|---|---|---|---|---|---|---|---|
| Record high °C (°F) | 32.0 (89.6) | 30.0 (86.0) | 34.0 (93.2) | 39.0 (102.2) | 36.0 (96.8) | 35.0 (95.0) | 29.0 (84.2) | 29.0 (84.2) | 29.0 (84.2) | 29.5 (85.1) | 28.0 (82.4) | 28.0 (82.4) | 39.0 (102.2) |
| Mean daily maximum °C (°F) | 20.3 (68.5) | 21.8 (71.2) | 24.3 (75.7) | 26.2 (79.2) | 27.1 (80.8) | 24.1 (75.4) | 21.4 (70.5) | 21.6 (70.9) | 21.4 (70.5) | 21.8 (71.2) | 21.4 (70.5) | 20.5 (68.9) | 22.7 (72.9) |
| Daily mean °C (°F) | 13.3 (55.9) | 14.2 (57.6) | 16.1 (61.0) | 18.0 (64.4) | 19.0 (66.2) | 18.0 (64.4) | 16.4 (61.5) | 16.5 (61.7) | 16.3 (61.3) | 15.8 (60.4) | 14.9 (58.8) | 13.9 (57.0) | 16.0 (60.8) |
| Mean daily minimum °C (°F) | 6.4 (43.5) | 6.6 (43.9) | 7.9 (46.2) | 9.9 (49.8) | 11.0 (51.8) | 11.8 (53.2) | 11.3 (52.3) | 11.4 (52.5) | 11.2 (52.2) | 9.7 (49.5) | 8.3 (46.9) | 7.3 (45.1) | 9.4 (48.9) |
| Record low °C (°F) | −3.0 (26.6) | 1.0 (33.8) | 1.0 (33.8) | 1.0 (33.8) | 2.0 (35.6) | 1.0 (33.8) | 6.0 (42.8) | 6.0 (42.8) | 4.0 (39.2) | 2.0 (35.6) | 0.0 (32.0) | −3.0 (26.6) | −3.0 (26.6) |
| Average precipitation mm (inches) | 29.7 (1.17) | 15.6 (0.61) | 9.7 (0.38) | 11.4 (0.45) | 44.2 (1.74) | 178.6 (7.03) | 231.3 (9.11) | 199.6 (7.86) | 161.4 (6.35) | 98.4 (3.87) | 26.7 (1.05) | 15.9 (0.63) | 1,022.5 (40.26) |
| Average precipitation days (≥ 0.1 mm) | 2.3 | 1.2 | 0.9 | 1.5 | 4.7 | 15.9 | 20.7 | 18.7 | 15.5 | 9.6 | 3.0 | 1.7 | 95.7 |
Source: Servicio Meteorologico Nacional

=== Flora and fauna ===
Its flora is composed mainly of pine, oak, arbutus, huizache, mesquite, palo dulce, nopal, granjeno, and some fruit species.

The wildlife includes deer, porcupine, wild cat, rabbit, squirrel, the eagle, the sparrowhawk, chachalaca and wild guajolote.

== Economy ==
26.37% of the population is engaged in the primary sector, 26.45% in the secondary sector, 42.31% in the tertiary sector and the rest were not specified. 30.78% is economically active. The main economic activities are: agriculture, forestry, fisheries, livestock, industry and services.

- Agriculture: cultivated corn, oats, barley, beans, potatoes, broad beans and tomatoes.
- Livestock: breeding cattle, pigs, cows and horses. In addition to birds.
- Tourism: architectural and natural attractions.
- Trade: these include restaurants, shops and market. Predominates the sale of essential goods and shops that sell mixed miscellaneous items.
- Services: provided financial services, professional, technical, communal, social, tourism, personal and maintenance.
- Industry: food processing plants such as dairy products, canned food and cajeta.
- Logging: Primarily pine and oak.
- Mining: there are deposits of lime, sand as well as use of quarries.

== Infrastructure ==
=== Education ===
90.11% of the population is literate, of whom 31.28% have completed primary education. The municipality has 18 preschools, 30 Elementary schools, 3 middle schools, 1 high school, and 2 job training centers.

=== Health ===
The city's health care is supported by the Ministry of Health, the Instituto Mexicano del Seguro Social (IMSS), the Instituto de Seguridad y Servicios Sociales de los Trabajadores del Estado, and private doctors. El Sistema para el Desarrollo Integral de la Familia (DIF) is in charge of social welfare.

=== Sport ===
Mazamitla offers various sports centers for football, basketball, volleyball and extreme sports like hiking, mountaineering, hunting, and racing. The town also has a cultural center, plaza, cinema, palenques, a museum, municipal auditorium, lienzo charro, parks, gardens, and a library.

=== Housing ===
There are 2,674 houses, most of which are privately owned. 96.33% have electric service, 76.93% have sewer and drinking water service. Most construction is made of tile, adobe, concrete and brick.

=== Services ===
The municipality has potable water, sewerage, street lighting, markets, rastro, cemeteries, roads, public cleaning services, public safety, parks, gardens, and sports centers. 89.9% of residents have drinking water, 80.9% have sewage access, and 93.3% have electrictricity access.

=== Ways and means of communication ===
Mazamitla has access to mail services, fax, telegraph, telephone, radio services, as well as radio and television signals. The transportation is carried across the road Guadalajara–Tuxcueca-Mazamitla. It has a network of rural roads that connect the localities; transportation is carried out in public buses or rental vehicles and taxis. The foreign ground transportation is carried out in public buses, the most important are: Buses Valle de Juarez, Autobuses de Occidente, Autobuses Flecha Amarilla, Autobuses del sur de Jalisco, Autotransportes de Mazamitla, y Autobuses de Tamazula.

== Demographics ==
According to Count II Population and Housing, the municipality has 11,671 inhabitants, of whom 5,502 are male and 6,169 are female; 0.53% of the population are indigenous peoples.

Historical population
| Year | 1980 | 1990 | 2000 | 2005 |
| Pop. | 8,765 | 10,226 | 11,004 | 15,742 |
| ±% | — | +16.7% | +7.6% | +43.1% |

=== Religion ===
In the population 96.92% profess Catholicism; there are also believers of Jehovah's Witnesses, Protestants and various other religions. 0.30% of the inhabitants profess to practice no religion whatsoever.

== Culture ==
=== Sites of interest ===
- Jardín Encantado.
- Parroquia de San Cristóbal.
- Bosque La Zanja.
- Bosque Las Charandas.
- Bosque El Chacal.
- Sierra Del Tigre.
- La Cañada.
- Cascada El Salto.
- Los Cazos.
- Bosque El Tabardillo.
- Bosque Las Peñitas.
- Bosque Pinos de Mazamitla.
- Mirador Las Peñitas.
- La casa de los fuentes.

=== Fiestas ===
- Fiestas de San Cristobal (patron saint of people) in the second week of July.
- Feast of the Virgin of Guadalupe: from 4 to 12 December.
- Patriotic Fiestas: September 15 and 16.
- Festival de las flores Weekends of October
- Celebrations of the founding of Mazamitla: from 27 to 30 March.

== Government ==
The form of government is democratic and depends on the state and federal governments; elections are held every 3 years, which elects the mayor and his cabinet. The municipal president is Jorge Enrique Magaña Valencia, a member of the party named Hagamos, who was elected on 6 June 2021. The municipality has 58 villages, the most important are: La Cofradía, Corral Falso, Epenche Grande, Epeche Chico, Puerto de Cuevas, Puerta del Zapatero, El Zapatero, La Huevera, Llano de los Toros.

=== Municipal presidents ===
| Municipal president | Term | Political party | Notes |
| Silvestre Ceja Zepeda | 1983–1985 | PRI | |
| Eduardo Sánchez Martínez | 01-01-1986–31-12-1988 | PRI | |
| Cirilo Chávez Anguiano | 01-01-1989–1992 | PRI | |
| Enrique González Gálvez | 1992–1995 | PRI | |
| Aurelio Bonifacio Toscano Hernández | 1995–1997 | PRI | |
| Ismael Rogelio Pulido Mata | 01-01-1998–31-12-2000 | PRD | |
| Eduardo Anaya Ruan | 01-01-2001–31-12-2003 | PRI | |
| Miguel Mejía Contreras | 01-01-2004–31-12-2006 | PRI | |
| Eduardo Anaya Ruan | 01-01-2007–31-12-2009 | PRI | |
| Jorge Bernal Lara | 01-01-2010–30-09-2012 | PRD | |
| Eduardo Anaya Ruan | 01-10-2012–30-09-2015 | PRI; PVEM | |
| Antonio de Jesús Ramírez Ramos | 01-10-2015–30-09-2018 | PRI; PVEM | |
| Antonio de Jesús Ramírez Ramos | 01-10-2018–30-09-2021 | PVEM | Was reelected on 1 July 2018 |
| Jorge Enrique Magaña Valencia | 01-10-2021– | Hagamos | |

== Twinned cities ==
Mazamitla is officially twinned with 2 cities and associated with 1 state of USA

- (United States) Denton, Texas
- (United States) Cincinnati, Ohio
- (United States) Kentucky
- (United States) Gatlinburg, Tennessee
- (United States) Norco, California Mayor Armando Chavez
