= Belize Sugar Cane Farmers Association =

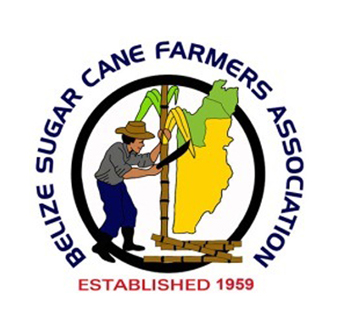

The Belize Sugar Cane Farmer Association (BSCFA) is an organization that represents the cane farmers of Northern Belize by negotiating in their behalf so as to achieve development. BSCFA has two divisions which are Corozal District and Orange Walk District each one consisting of nine branches and the organization presently has more than 5000 cane farmers as members. Presently, 94% of the cane farmers are small cane farmers that have licences to deliver 550 tons of cane or less. The BSCFA Orange Walk office is located at #34 San Antonio Road, Orange Walk Town, Orange Walk District, Belize and the Corozal office is located at 7th Avenue, Corozal Town, Corozal District, Belize.

== History ==
The birth of Belize Sugar Cane Farmers Association was triggered by a tropical hurricane by the name of Janet. The hurricane severely affected the cane industry in the north of Belize, as a result there was the need for an implementation of a policy so that the industry would be rehabilitated and expanded with the assistance of the government. Sir Colin Thornely, the governor at that time, held a public meeting with the cane farmers in Louisville on October 10, 1955 whereby he promised to review the question of legislation so to help the organization of cane farmers to become a cooperative unit. The planter Cooperative was then formed in year of 1956 whereby it was a direct result of the Governor's action. In December 1959, the Government, after consultation with all sides of the sugar industry, passed two important ordinances which regulated the whole sugar industry in this country. These were No. 12 of 1959 ( The Sugar Industry (Control) Ordinance) setting up the Sugar Board and the licensing and delivery quota systems among other things and No.13 of 1959 (The Sugar Cane Farmers’ Association Ordinance). Therefore, the Belize Cane Farmers Association was established in the year of 1959. In the year 2008 the Belize Sugar Cane Farmers Association was Fairtrade Certified. Resulting from the certification, BSCFA receives approximately $3.5bz a year in Fair-trade Premiums for sales of Fair-trade cane sugar. The organizations currently utilizes as consequence of its certification, the organization modified its body whereby innovative procedural and organizational systems were introduced which up to now it is assisting the organization itself so as to be competitive in the sugar market. Due to significant development, BSCFA has given birth to a new department in their organization which is the Environmental Department. Its function is to implement programs that deal with environmental challenges being faced by the cane farmers.
