= San Luis Soyatlán =

- Town
- Nickname: San Luisito
- Motto: "Pueblo de pescadores y vaqueros." "La tierra del Vampiro"
- Location in Mexico
- Coordinates: 20°11′51.2″N 103°18′23.2″W
- Country: Mexico
- State: Jalisco
- Municipality: Tuxcueca

Area
  - Total: 1.58 km^{2} (0.61 sq mi)

Population (2020 census)
  - Total: 3,814
  - Density: 2,410/km^{2} (6,250/sq mi)
- Time zone: UTC-6 (Central Standard Time)
  - Summer (DST): UTC-5 (Central Daylight Time)
- Postal Code: 49440
- Area code: 376

San Luis Soyatlán (pronounced [san ˈlwis soʝatˈlan]) is a town located in the state of Jalisco in central-western Mexico, and is part of the municipality of Tuxcueca. It is the most populous town of the municipality, accounting for more than 60% of the population and generating 70% of its revenues. The town sits on the south shore of Lake Chapala, and about 45 minutes south from the city of Guadalajara.

Its name derives from two languages, from Spanish; "San Luis" which refers to the patronage of the saint of the population; Saint Louis of Toulouse, and the other "Soyatlán" which is Nahuatl meaning "place of soyates" (the fiber of soyate is the primary material for Mexican mats and hats).

== History ==
It is known that the municipality of Tuxcueca was inhabited before the Spanish conquest; San Luis Soyatlán was founded by nomadic Chichimeca tribes who settled on the side of the river Las Cerretas. Some years before the conquest this region was invaded and governed by the King of the Purépecha, Tangaxoan Tzíntzicha who took over the coveted saltpetre fields of Zacoalco and Sayula. By the end of the early 16th century this led to the Saltpetre War against the King of Colima.

Since its establishment as an official town, it was formerly part of the municipality of Jocotepec. However, due to the intervention of General Ramón Corona, on April 20, 1886, the town of Tuxcueca stands itself as a municipality, during the tenure of Governor Francisco Tolentino, separating from the municipality of Tizapán el Alto. In 1888, October 1, San Luis Soyatlán was added to the municipality, separating from Jocotepec.

== Attractions ==
The locality of San Luis Soyatlán is the strongest of the municipality as far as the tourist sector goes. This locality is a very urban-like site, mostly due to having the highway (Mexican Federal Highway 15) crossing right through the middle of the town. Throughout this same route (labeled for local purposes as Avenue Alvaro Obregón) are different commercial premises, small super stores, restaurants, ice cream parlours, fruit shops, pharmacies, among other commerce.

=== Town’s Center ===
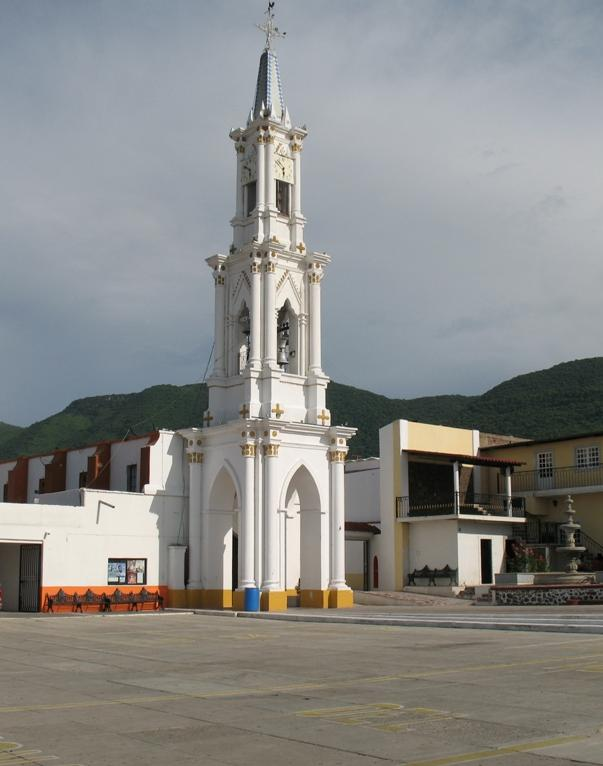
San Luis Soyatlán's Catholic Church.

Saint Louis of Toulouse Church. First as an adobe chapel in 1564 by the French Sebastian Vilches and Christopher Berlanga, it was completed on December 22, 1885 (without the tower). standing in front of a Square Atrium with religious statues, a forum, meeting rooms, restrooms and public parking. It is the main place for public events.

The Plaza de Armas (main plaza), dates from the fifteenth century has undergone several renovations keeping its traditionally modern state. Not popular as a commercial area during the day, at night and more commonly during weekends, it fills itself with street food posts. On the north side of the plaza is the Municipal Delegation (Mexican equivalent to a regional City Hall). Construction of a seventeenth-century style with arches, where municipal services are offered (police office, an ATM by bank Santander, land registry, and postal services).

Capilla del Señor de la Salud (Small catholic chapel in devotion to the Lord of the Health) is located a few blocks from the main church of San Luis Soyatlán. This Christ is revered and is considered miraculous (among local Catholics), so it is important to include it in recommended sites to visit in the municipality.

=== Parks ===
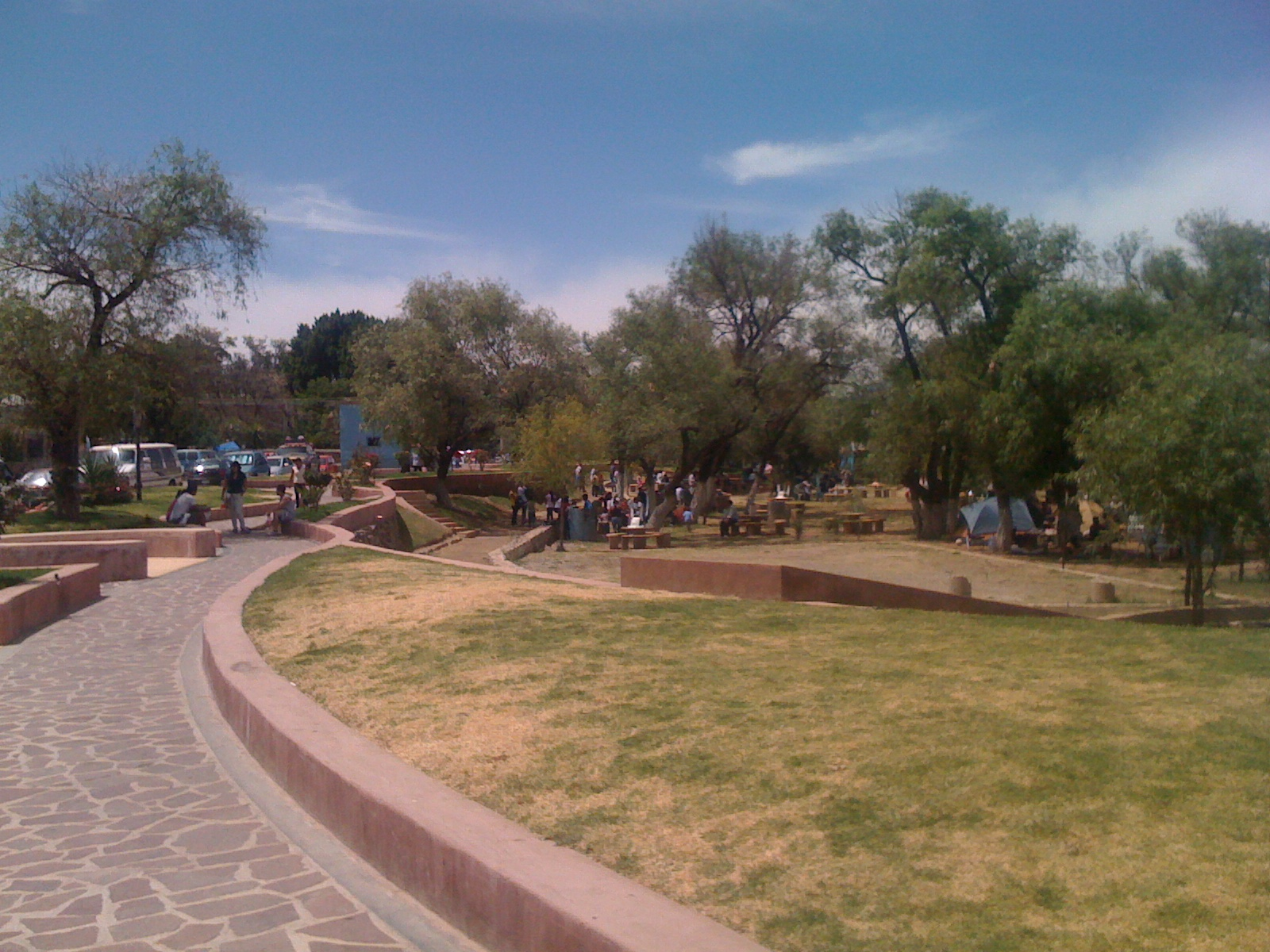
Park on the town's riviera.

Eden Ecological Park of over 40,000m2 located next to the lake's southern shore consisting of two docks, grills, playground, tables, walks, two streams, palm tree lined base, cypresses, grasses, shrubs, bathrooms, meeting areas, and a view of the northern shore.

=== Rural Areas ===
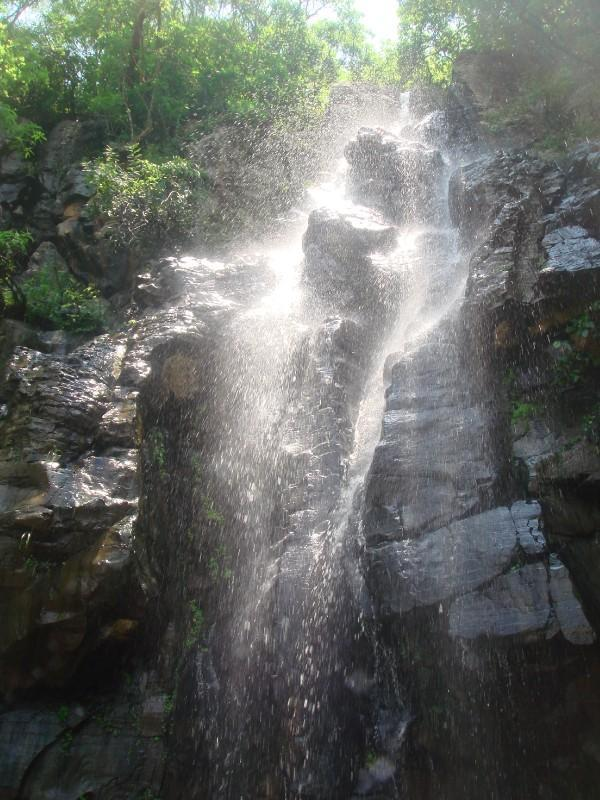
Cascade on one of the town's hills.

Situated less than 5 km south of the population, located on a hill top of about 273 meters higher than the lake shore, is the Mirador y la Cruz (a viewpoint and cross). Where a big metal cross stands “overlooking” the north shore of the lake and the town itself, with a shrine to the Virgin of Guadalupe nearby.

El Salto (“The Jump”) waterfall over 30m (three stages) in height, it's visited mostly during the rainy season.

Among the natural attractions of the surrounding landscapes include The Garcia Mountain, the highest mountain on the lake's shore, with almost 2,600m in height. Providing a high view of the entire lake, Sierra del Tigre, Huejotitán Valley, to the basin of Sayula and El Picacho. It also has small caves at the summit where some vessels and ceramics have been found.

The natural wealth available to the municipality is represented by 10,400 hectares of woodland, where mainly oak and pine species predominate.

== Festivities ==
Fiestas Patronales are festivities in honor to Saint Louis of Toulouse. These patron saint festivities are held from the 10 to the 19 of August, with pilgrimages around the town, morning masses with early morning mañanitas in devotion to the saint and during the evening; rides, fireworks, balloon posts, food stands, and serenades in the main plaza during the night. The festivities are held in August from the 11th to the 19th.

Like most common fiestas patronales in Mexico, each day is given a guild. Every guild is given a particular group of people to fund it, along with one of its four districts: San Juan District, San Miguel District, San Pedro District, or San Francisco District. The guilds are as follows:

1. Guild of the Youth, Masons, and Fishermen.
2. Guild of the Absent Children from Guadalajara.
3. Guild of the Town Council.
4. Guild of the Livestock Owners and Communal Lands (or Ejido) Holders.
5. Guild of the Absent Children from the United States. With a unique tradition done only in San Luis of a soccer game played between the people that live in the town year-round (team known as the "tilapias") and the people that come from the U.S. (team known as the "hamburgesas" or the "hamburgers")
6. Guild of the Town in General (Usually on the 19th). On 19 August (official day of Saint Louis of Toulouse), the town invites the neighboring towns of San Nicolas de Acuña and La Puerta de San Nicolas to the fiesta, which is followed traditionally with a pilgrimage of those towns' people into San Luis.
7. Guild of the Commercialists. With a tradition of a contracted instrumental band doing a certain number of songs in front of the small businesses of the town.
8. Guild of the Professionals and Missionaries.
9. Individual Guild and Town in General (done only on the last day). The Individual guild is paid by one person or family.

Every day (depending on the guild) is given a color. The people whose day their given, wear a sash of that color during the traditional pilgrimage done during each afternoon before mass. The current colors are as follows:

1. White
2. Royal Blue
3. Sky Blue
4. Green
5. Red
6. Tint
7. Yellow
8. Orange
9. Purple

Enramadas (huts or hut season) are festivities held throughout the entire lent period. A time when huts, serving food and drinks, are placed at the town's lake riviera park.

== In popular culture ==
The town has been mentioned in 2 songs by major Mexican artists:

Song	Written by	Performed by	Original album
"Don Arturo García"		Chalino Sánchez	"El Gallo de Sinaloa" (1995)
"El corrido de José Reyes"	Leopoldo Macias	Banda El Recodo	La número uno... con puras rancheras (1988)

== Schools ==
- Benito Juarez School is an elementary school. Providing basic education (Primary General). Classes are held in morning schedule. Address: Allende 50 (Rivera Del Lago and Obregon) San Luis Soyatlán, Municipio: Tuxcueca, Jal. 49440.
- Emiliano Zapata is an elementary school, providing basic education (Primary General). Classes are held during evening hours. Address: 5, MAY 73 (Chapultepec and Pino) San Luis Soyatlán Municipio: Tuxcueca, Jal. 49440.
- EMSAD San Luis Soyatlán is a high school, providing high school education (Baccalaureate General). Classes are held during evening hours. Website: www.cobaej.eu.mx
- Escuela Secundaria Tecnica 99 is a middle school, providing basic education (Secondary Technical). Classes are held in morning schedule.
- Gregorio Torres Quintero is an elementary school, providing basic education (Primary General). Classes are held in morning schedule. Address: 5 de Mayo 73 (Chapultepec and Pino) San Luis Soyatlán Municipio: Tuxcueca, Jal. 49440.
- Jose Vasconcelos is a preschool, providing basic education (Pre-general). Classes are held during evening hours. Address: Turkey 8 (Alvaro Obregon and Rivera Del Lago) San Luis Soyatlán Municipio: Tuxcueca, Jal. 49440.
- Octavio Chavaria Cervantes is an elementary school, providing basic education (Primary General). Classes are held in morning schedule. Address: Zaragoza 51 (Hidalgo and Lerdo de Tejada) San Luis Soyatlán Municipio: Tuxcueca, Jal. 49440.
- Sor Juana Ines De La Cruz is a preschool providing basic education (Pre-general). Classes are held in morning schedule. Address: Pino Suarez 86 (Paseo De Las Lomas and 5 de Mayo) San Luis Soyatlán Municipio: Tuxcueca, Jal. 49440.
