= Lake Chapala =

Mexico's largest freshwater lake

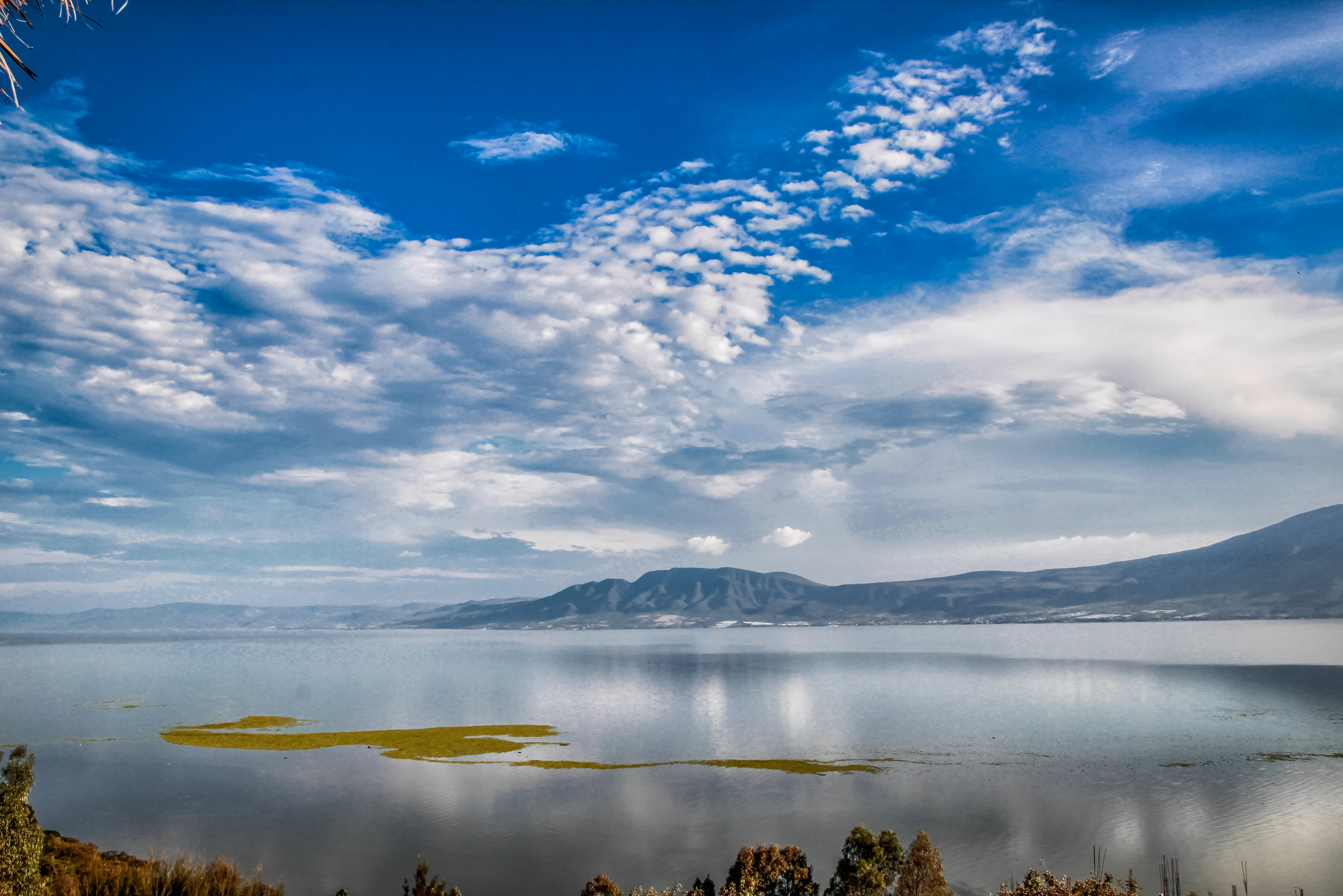

- Location within Jalisco Location within Michoacán Location within Mexico
- Location: Jalisco / Michoacán, Mexico
- Coordinates: 20°15′N 103°00′W
- Primary inflows: Río Lerma, Río Zula, Río Huaracha, Río Duero
- Primary outflows: Río Grande de Santiago
- Basin countries: Mexico
- Max. length: 80 km (50 mi)
- Max. width: 18 km (11 mi)
- Surface area: 1,100 km^{2} (420 sq mi)
- Average depth: 7 m (23 ft)
- Max. depth: 10.5 m (34 ft)
- Water volume: 8.1 km^{3} (1.9 cu mi)
- Surface elevation: 1,524 m (5,000 ft)
- Islands: 3

Ramsar Wetland
- Official name: Lago de Chapala
- Designated: 2 February 2009
- Reference no.: 1973

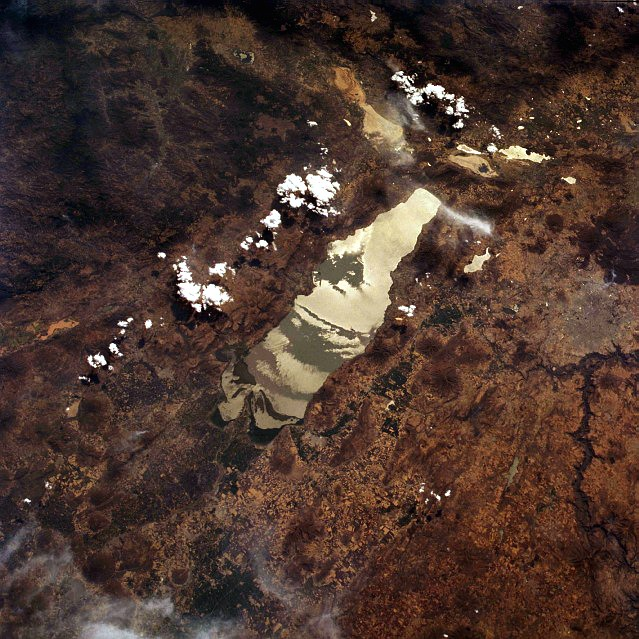
Lake Chapala from space, 1994

Lake Chapala (Spanish: Lago de Chapala, [tʃaˈpala]) has been Mexico's largest freshwater lake since the desiccation of Lake Texcoco in the early 17th century.

It borders both the states of Jalisco and Michoacán, being located within the municipalities of Ocotlán, Chapala, Jocotepec, Poncitlán, and Jamay, in Jalisco, and in Venustiano Carranza and Cojumatlán de Régules, in Michoacán.

== Geography ==
=== Geographic features ===
It is located at 20°20′N 103°00′W, 45 kilometres (28 mi) southeast of Guadalajara, Jalisco, and is situated on the border between the states of Jalisco and Michoacán, at 1,524 metres (5000 feet) above sea level. Its approximate dimensions are 80 km (50 mi) from east to west and averages 12.5 km (7.8 miles) from north to south, and covers an approximate area of 1,100 km^{2} (420 sq mi).

It is a shallow lake, with a mean depth of 7 metres (23 ft) and a maximum of 10.5 m (34 ft). The age of Lake Chapala, which is located in one of the youngest geological areas of the American continent, has been established by means of carbon-14 dating of wood samples encountered in the sediments. These specimens indicate an age of 38,000 years, establishing the lake as occurring in late Pleistocene time, a geological epoch that spanned 1,000,000 to 25,000 years ago.

It is fed by the Río Lerma, Río Zula, Río Huaracha, and Río Duero rivers and was formerly drained by the Rio Grande de Santiago. The water then would normally flow northwest into the Pacific Ocean; however, no water has flowed out of the lake in over 30 years due to a fall in the supply of incoming water from the Lerma River.

=== Islands ===
The lake contains three small islands: Isla de los Alacranes (most visible from the town of Chapala), Isla Mezcala (the largest island, featuring an old Spanish fort and an old Mexican prison), and a third very small island next to Isla Mezcala called La Isla Menor.

=== Mountains ===
There are many mountains and sierras that surround Lake Chapala: Cerro Viejo-Chupinaya-Los Sabinos (Sierra San Juan Cosalá), Cerro San Miguel-Chiquihuitillo, Cerro San Bartolo-Los Ocotes, Cerro Gomeño, Cerro de García-Del Picacho-El Gachupín (Sierra del Tigre).

== Ecology ==
The city of Guadalajara has relied on Lake Chapala as a principal source of water since the 1950s. Shortly after, a few consecutive years of poor rainfall dramatically decreased the water level of the lake. The level rebounded until 1979, when Lake Chapala's water level began rapidly decreasing due to increases in urban water consumption.

Erosion due to deforestation along the lake as well as the Lerma River has led to increased sedimentation of the lake, also contributing to loss of lake depth. The shrinking depth has also raised the lake's average temperature, resulting in increased evaporation.

Simultaneously, the waters of Lake Chapala are polluted by municipal, industrial and agricultural wastes, coming primarily from the Lerma River. The increased presence of nutrients from the pollution combined with the warmer water has been a boon to an invasive species of water hyacinth.

The increase in water pollution has had devastating effects on the ecology of the lake. Fish stock has decreased dramatically and some endemic species (e.g. certain Chirostoma) are on the verge of extinction. Contaminated fish stock has also posed a serious threat to the health and livelihoods of people who depend on the fish for food.

The drop in the lake's water level has uncovered political issues that had been hidden for many years. Its fast decay has raised concern in the surrounding areas and in the scientific community. It was the Global Nature Fund's "Threatened Lake of the Year" in 2004.

By 2007 and 2008, the level of Lake Chapala had increased drastically, though the levels have yet to surpass the level in 1979, when the levels began a precipitous decline. Although it is still subject to agricultural, domestic, and industrial sources of contamination, the actual levels of hazardous materials have not been officially assessed with regularity.

Although water level and quality improved due to water treatment plants along the Lerma river, in 2017, the water quality of Lake Chapala was assessed as a risk to public health.

In July 2022, the Lake Chapala water level was at 63.63% of capacity, down from 81.68% in 2018 and 66.66% in 2017.

=== Habitat and species ===
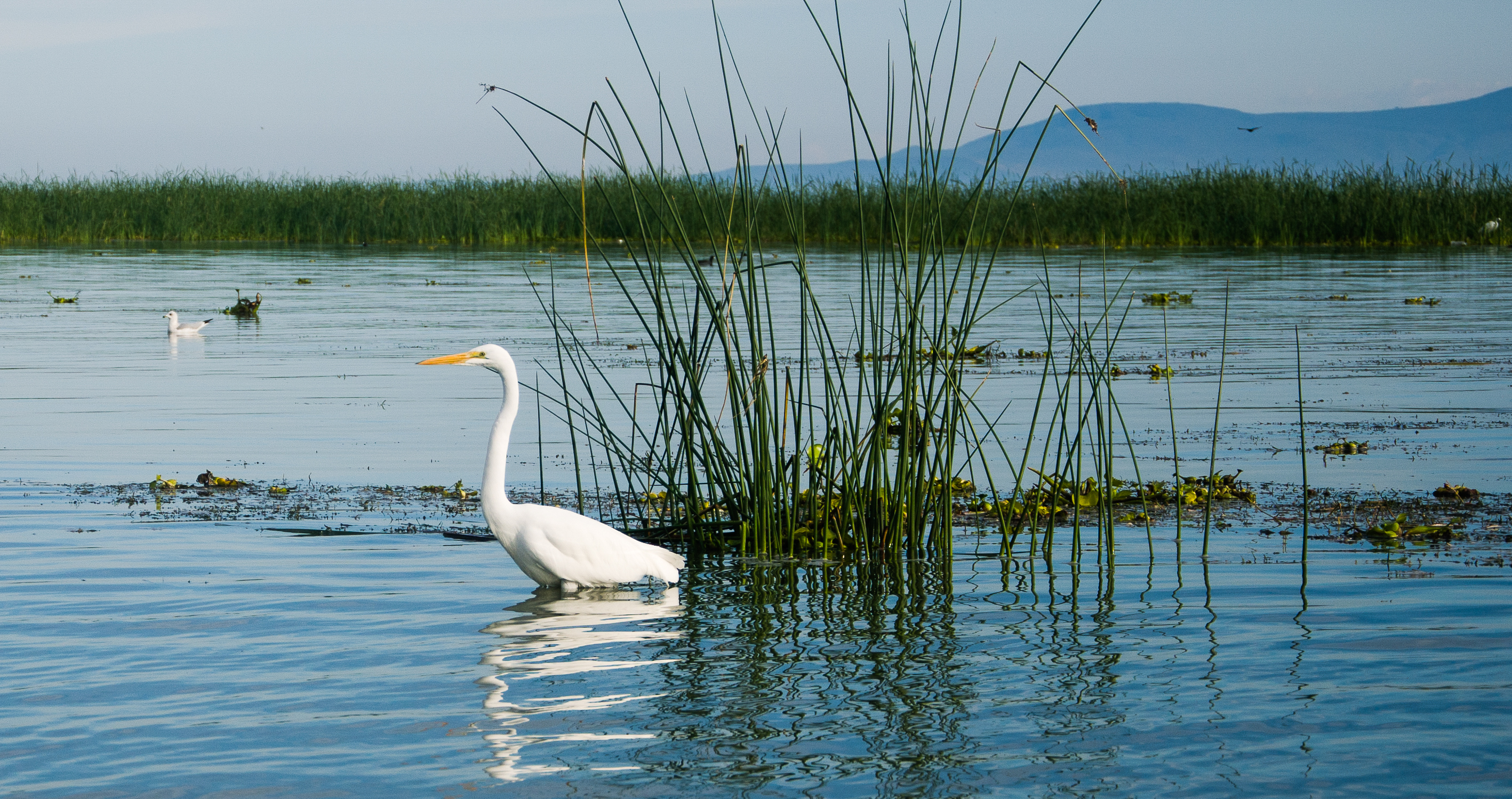
Great egret at Chapala Lake

The lake is a critical habitat for several species of migratory birds, such as the American white pelican, and home to thousands of indigenous plants and animals. The Audubonistas de Laguna de Chapala holds an annual Audubon Society sponsored Christmas Bird Count. In 2006, some 117 species were identified and, in 2007, the count was 125. By January 2011, some 173 species were recorded.

The subspecies chapalaense of the rough-footed mud turtle is largely restricted to Lake Chapala, while the more widespread subspecies murrayi inhabits the Lerma River basin (and some other regions in northern Mexico). The essentially harmless, semi-aquatic obscurus subspecies of the Mexican garter snake is restricted to the lake.

In addition to the Chirostoma ("charales") species flock of fish, the lake and associated rivers are home to many other endemics, including several goodeids, a few Algansea chubs, two Tetrapleurodon lampreys, two Ictalurus catfish, the Chapala chub (Yuriria chapalae) and more. Several of these are highly threatened. Other aquatic species found only in the lake and associated water systems are four cambarid crayfish: Cambarellus chapalanus, C. lermensis, C. prolixus and Procambarus digueti.

== Communities ==
There are numerous towns and cities along the coast of Lake Chapala, including San Juan Tecomatlan, Chapala, Ajijic, San Antonio Tlayacapan, Jocotepec, San Juan Cosala, San Luis Soyatlán, Mezcala de la Asunción, Tizapan El Alto, La Palma, Michoacán and Ocotlán.

According to Tony Burton in his book Lake Chapala through the ages: an anthology of traveller’s tales, westerners have been interested in Lake Chapala since Spanish conquistadors first arrived uninvited in 1530. Lake Chapala tourism started in the 19th century and steadily pick up in the early 20th century. Beginning in the 1950s, because of the pleasant climate and attractive scenery, a substantial colony of retirees, including many from the United States and Canada, has been established along the lake's shore, particularly in the town of Ajijic, located just west of the city of Chapala, but also in many other towns, such as San Nicolas De Ibarra, San Juan Tecomatlan and Tlachichilco Del Carmen. An estimated 30,000 foreign residents live along the shores of Lake Chapala.

== See also ==
- Concheros
- Coca people
