= La Manzanilla de La Paz =

- Municipality and town
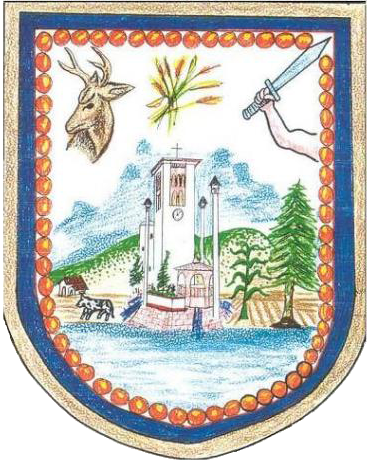
- Coat of arms

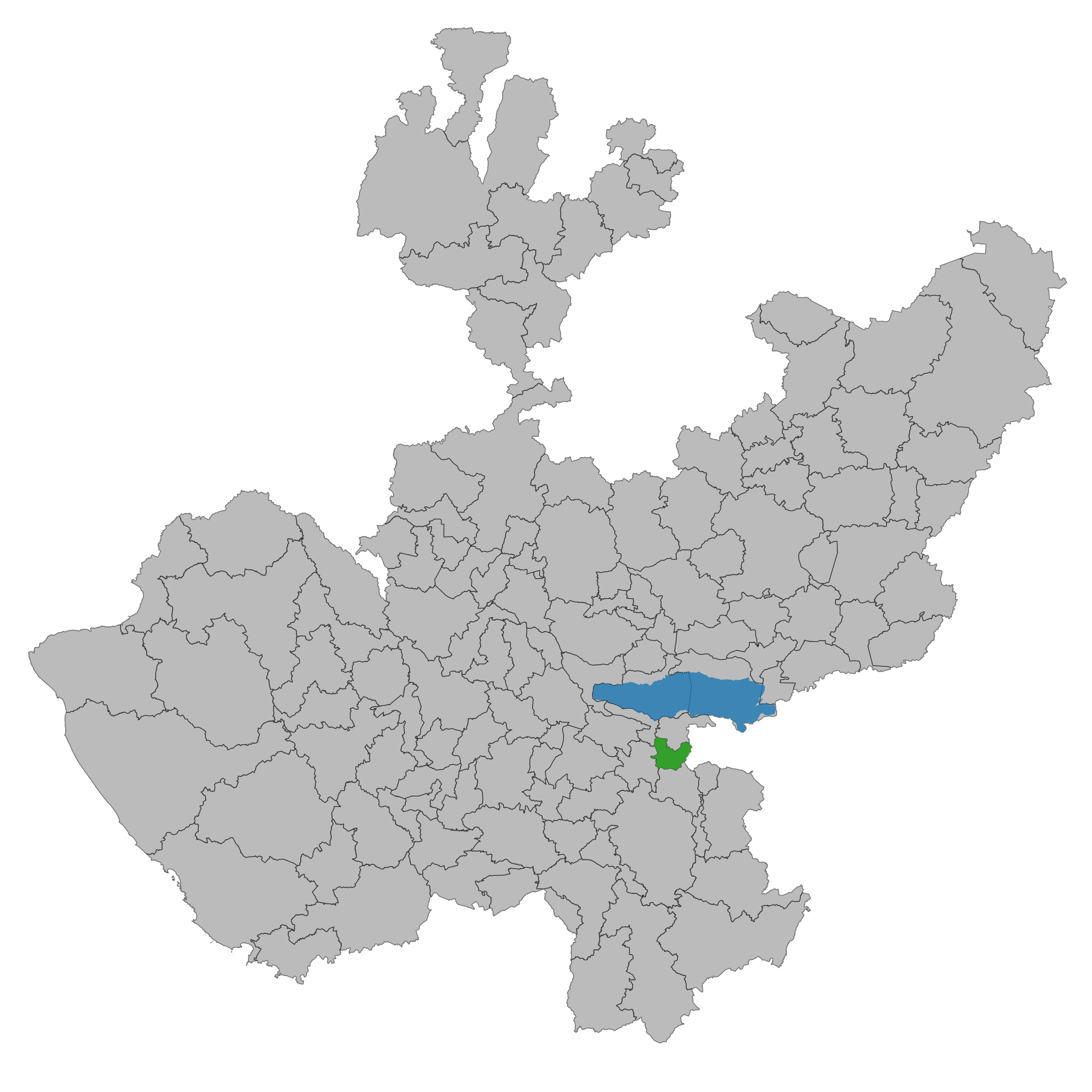
- Location of the municipality in Jalisco

- Location in Mexico
- Coordinates: 20°0′18″N 103°9′20″W
- Country: Mexico
- State: Jalisco

Area
  - Total: 134 km^{2} (52 sq mi)
  - Town: 1.32 km^{2} (0.51 sq mi)
- Elevation: 2,013 m (6,604 ft)

Population (2020 census)
  - Total: 4,099
  - Density: 30.6/km^{2} (79.2/sq mi)
  - Town: 2,728
  - Town density: 2,070/km^{2} (5,350/sq mi)
- Time zone: UTC-6 (Central Standard Time)

La Manzanilla de La Paz is a town and municipality, in Jalisco in central-western Mexico. The municipality covers an area of 134 km^{2}. As of 2020, the municipality had a total population of 4,099.

== Toponymy ==
According to tradition, the name comes from the abundance of hawthorn trees called manzanilla or apples, and "de la Paz" for being a peaceful people. Previously it was called San Miguel de las Flores.

== History ==
Before the arrival of the Spanish, this region was inhabited by the Purépecha, within the Purépecha Empire. The conquest of the area was carried out in 1523 by Alonso de Avalos who was sent by Hernán Cortés to conquer the West.

It was founded around the year 1882, when the inhabitants of the Guadalajarita, San Miguel de las Flores and El Rincon ranches agreed to form a congregation called La Manzanilla, being recognized as a precinct of the Tizapan el Alto municipality.

At the beginning of the century there was a cluster of brick and grass houses. With the surrounding ranches, it scarcely had 900 inhabitants. It belonged to the Canton of Sayula.

Its elevation to a municipality dates back to 1909, pursuant to Decree number 1307. Its first mayor was Irineo López. In La Manzanilla words of Purépecha origin remain, for example, while farmers in the rest of the state call the ears of corn that do not grow well "molonco" in La Manzanilla it is called "toquere". They call the ears of corn "toquera", the "chiquihuite" is known as "chihuite" and bag or backpack is called "quimil" or "chitara".

On January 1, 1969, by decree number 8452, the name was changed to la Manzanilla de la Paz.

== Geography ==
=== Location ===
La Manzanilla de la Paz is located southeast of Jalisco. Its coordinates are 19°55'00" to 20°04'30" north latitude and 102º01'15" to 103º11'50" west longitude, at an altitude of 2013 meters above sea level.

The municipality is bordered on the north by the municipalities of Tuxcueca, Tizapan el Alto and the state of Michoacán on the east by the state of Michoacán and the Mazamitla municipality; on the south by the municipalities of Mazamitla and Concepción de Buenos Aires; on the west by the municipality of Concepción de Buenos Aires.

=== Topography ===
In general the surface is made up of flat areas (55%), there are also semi-flat areas (25%) and hilly areas (20%). Soils - The territory consists of land belonging to the Quaternary period. Soil composition is entirely of a Cambisol type. The municipality has a land area of 12,935 hectares, of which 5,800 are used for agriculture, 5,545 for livestock activity, 1430 are for forest use and 160 acres are urban lands. As far as property is concerned, an area of 10,343 hectares is private and 2,592 is state-owned. There is no communal property.

=== Hydrography ===
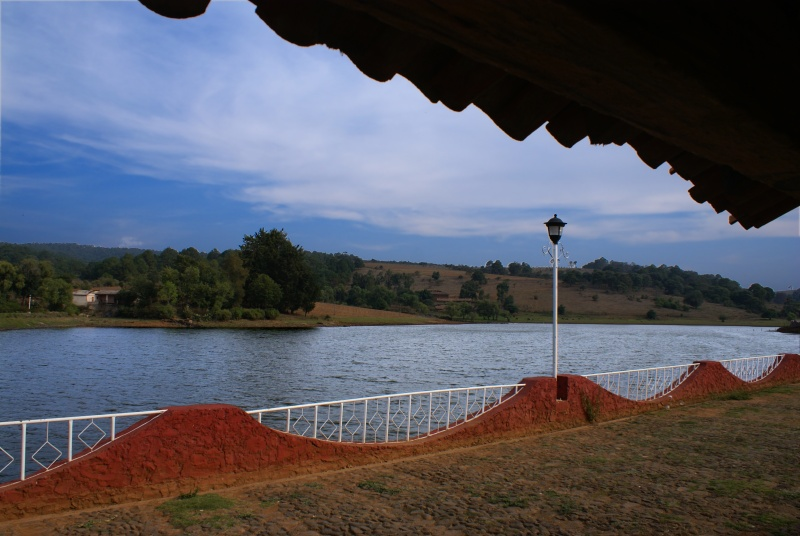
El Chiflón Dam

The Chiflón Dam belongs to the Central Pacific basin, La Passion-Tepalcatepec River subbasin.

Rivers
Rio Grande
Guadalajarita or
de la Pasión
Brooks
El Rincón
La Peña
Las Cuevas
La Soledad
El Cerrito
Los Piratas
La Esperanza
El Tule and
Palo Verde
Springs
La Atarjea
La Loma
Loma Alta
Sobinillas

=== Climate ===
The climate is semiarid, with dry winter and temperate with no well defined winter heat exchange. The average annual temperature is 19 °C, maximum 25.1 °C and minimum -05.8 °C. Rainfall is recorded between the months of June through August, with an average rainfall of 1,011.2 millimeters. The average annual frost days is 55.7. Prevailing winds blow towards the south.

=== Flora and fauna ===
Vegetation is represented by wooded areas to the south, which is dominated by pine and oak species. Rabbit, squirrel, skunk, deer and birds inhabit the town.

== Economy ==
- Livestock. Cattle, horses, goats and pigs are raised in addition to poultry and beehives.
- Agriculture. Produce include corn, beans, barley, oats, peach and pear.
- Trade. Dominated by establishments engaged in the sale of staples and mixed shops that sell various items.
- Services. Technical, community, personal and maintenance services are offered.
- Industry. Emphasis is on the manufacturing industry.
- Mining. There are untapped deposits of lime and quarry.
- Logging. Pine and oak are exploited.
- Fisheries. Carp is captured in the San Rafael and Villa Morelos dams.

== Tourism ==
Architecture

Main square.
Temple of San Miguel Arcangel.

Crafts

Development of:
Napkins,
Tablecloths,
Towels,
Folders,
Embroidered dresses,
Coats and
Tissues.

Parks and reserves

Cerro La Pitaya.
Cerro López.
Sierra Del Tigre.

Rivers and dams

The Chiflón dam.
Palo Verde.

== Festivals ==
Civil Festivals
Palenque and bullfighting/Annual Fiestas Charras Taurinas. In Passover week
Religious festivities
Feast in honor of San Miguel. From 21 to 29 September.
Feast in honor of Santa Ana de Pascua. In March.
Holy Thursday and Friday.

== Government ==
Its form of government is democratic and depends on the state and federal elections, held every 3 years, where the mayor and his cabinet is elected. The mayor is Rafael Alejandro Alvarez Espinoza, a member of PAN, which was elected in democratic elections held on July 5, 2009.
