= Hurricane Janet =

Category 5 Atlantic hurricane in 1955

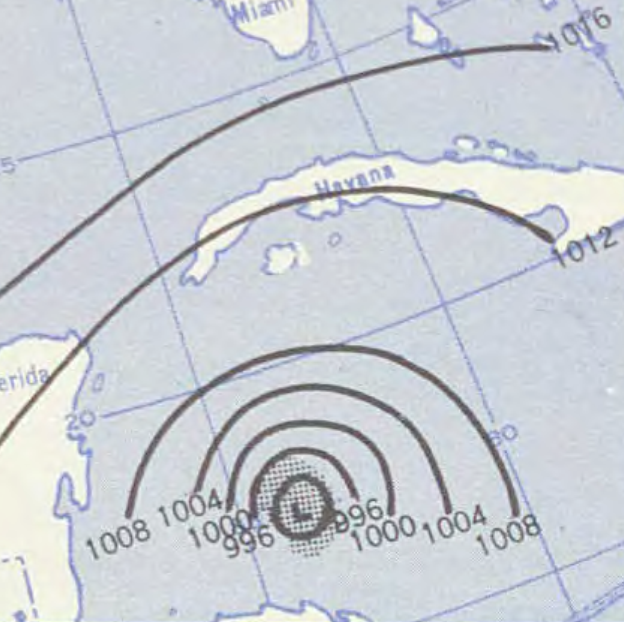
- Surface weather analysis of Hurricane Janet near peak intensity on September 28, 1955

Meteorological history
- Formed: September 21, 1955
- Dissipated: September 30, 1955

Category 5 major hurricane
- 1-minute sustained (SSHWS/NWS)
- Highest winds: 175 mph (280 km/h)
- Lowest pressure: ≤914 mbar (hPa); ≤26.99 inHg

Overall effects
- Fatalities: 1,023+ direct
- Damage: $65.8 million (1955 USD)
- Areas affected: Barbados, Windward Islands, British Honduras, Yucatán Peninsula, mainland Mexico
- IBTrACS
- Part of the 1955 Atlantic hurricane season

Hurricane Janet was the most powerful tropical cyclone of the 1955 Atlantic hurricane season and one of the strongest Atlantic hurricanes on record. Janet was also the first named storm to cause 1,000 deaths and the first Category 5 storm name to be retired. The eleventh tropical storm, ninth hurricane, and fourth major hurricane of the year, (Note: A major hurricane is a storm that ranks as Category 3 or higher on the Saffir–Simpson hurricane scale.) Janet formed from a tropical wave east of the Lesser Antilles on September 21. Moving westward across the Caribbean Sea, Janet fluctuated in intensity, but generally strengthened before reaching its peak intensity as a Category 5 hurricane with winds of 175 mph (282 km/h). The intense hurricane later made landfall at that intensity near Chetumal, Mexico on September 28. After weakening over the Yucatán Peninsula, it moved into the Bay of Campeche, where it slightly strengthened before making its final landfall near Veracruz on September 29. Janet quickly weakened over Mexico's mountainous terrain before dissipating on September 30.

In its developmental stages, Janet caused $7.8 million in damage to the Lesser Antilles and 189 deaths in the Grenadines and Barbados. (Note: All damage totals are in 1955 United States dollars unless otherwise noted.) While Janet was in the central Caribbean Sea, a reconnaissance aircraft flew into the storm and was lost with all hands. This remains the only such loss which has occurred in association with an Atlantic hurricane. A Category 5 upon landfall on the Yucatán Peninsula, Janet caused severe devastation in areas of Quintana Roo and British Honduras. Only five buildings in Chetumal, Mexico remained intact after the storm, and an estimated 500 deaths occurred in the Mexican state of Quintana Roo. At Janet's second landfall near Veracruz, significant river flooding ensued, worsening effects caused by Hurricanes Gladys and Hilda earlier in the month. The floods left thousands of people stranded and killed at least 326 people in the Tampico area, leading to the largest Mexican relief operation ever executed by the United States.

Janet's minimum barometric pressure, recorded in Chetumal, was at the time the second-lowest-recorded pressure on land associated with a tropical cyclone in the Atlantic, behind the 1935 Labor Day hurricane. At least 1,023 deaths were attributed to Hurricane Janet, as well as $65.8 million in damages. It also caused the extinction of the Little Swan Island hutia.

== Meteorological history ==
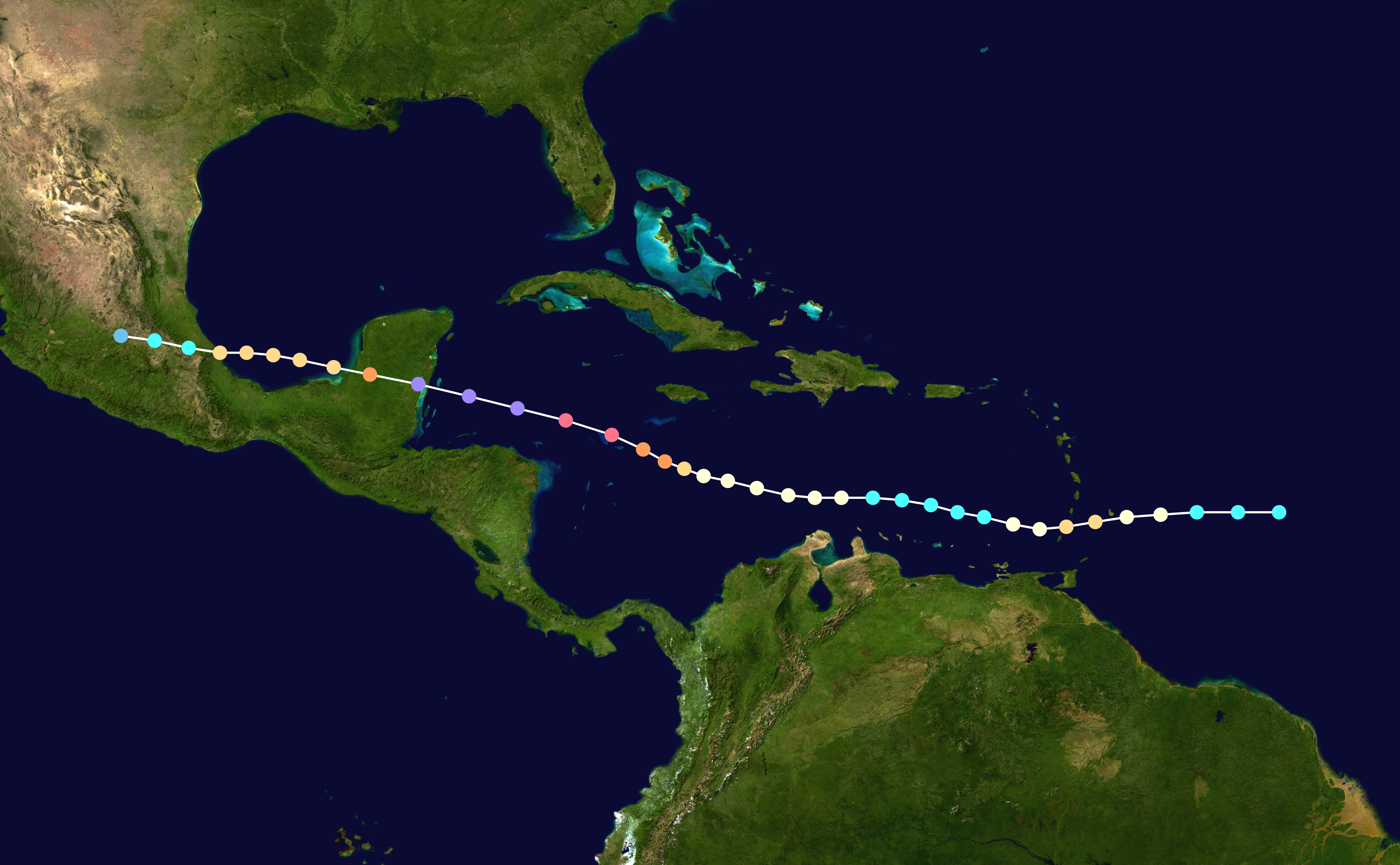
Map plotting the storm's track and intensity, according to the Saffir–Simpson scale Map key Saffir–Simpson scale Tropical depression (≤38 mph, ≤62 km/h) Tropical storm (39–73 mph, 63–118 km/h) Category 1 (74–95 mph, 119–153 km/h) Category 2 (96–110 mph, 154–177 km/h) Category 3 (111–129 mph, 178–208 km/h) Category 4 (130–156 mph, 209–251 km/h) Category 5 (≥157 mph, ≥252 km/h) Unknown Storm type Tropical cyclone Subtropical cyclone Extratropical cyclone, remnant low, tropical disturbance, or monsoon depression

A weak tropical disturbance was first reported by the Air France and Iberia airlines east of the Lesser Antilles early on September 21. Although it was speculated that the disturbance originated from a tropical wave near Cape Verde, the Weather Bureau considered the system too weak to be detected due to a lack of reports from the islands. At 1800 UTC on September 21, while it was located 350 miles (560 km) east-southeast of Martinique, the disturbance became sufficiently organized for the Weather Bureau to classify it as Tropical Storm Janet, the tenth named storm of the season. Upon classification, Janet quickly intensified as it moved to the west. On September 22, Janet attained hurricane strength, and proceeded to intensify rapidly as it moved westward across the Windward Islands. By 1200 UTC that day, Janet already attained Category 3 hurricane strength with maximum sustained winds of 120 mph (190 km/h), before stalling in intensification.

Shortly after 1700 UTC on September 22, the eye of Janet passed south of Barbados as a Category 1 Hurricane. A reconnaissance flight into the hurricane discovered that the Hurricane Janet's eye measured only 20 miles (32 km) in diameter, with gale-force winds extending 120 miles (190 km) away from the center of circulation. The flight also reported a minimum barometric pressure of 979 mbar (28.9 inHg). After passing between the islands of Grenada and Carriacou in the morning hours of September 23, Janet entered an area of unfavorable conditions in the eastern Caribbean Sea. As a result, the hurricane became disorganized, with winds weakening to 90 mph (140 km/h) by 1200 UTC on September 23. A U.S. Navy reconnaissance plane entered the hurricane early on September 24, reporting a lack of organization, and noting an indiscernible center of circulation with weak rainbands. However, the hurricane began to reintensify in favorable conditions, regaining major hurricane strength by 1200 UTC on September 24 and subsequently Category 4 hurricane intensity by the next day.

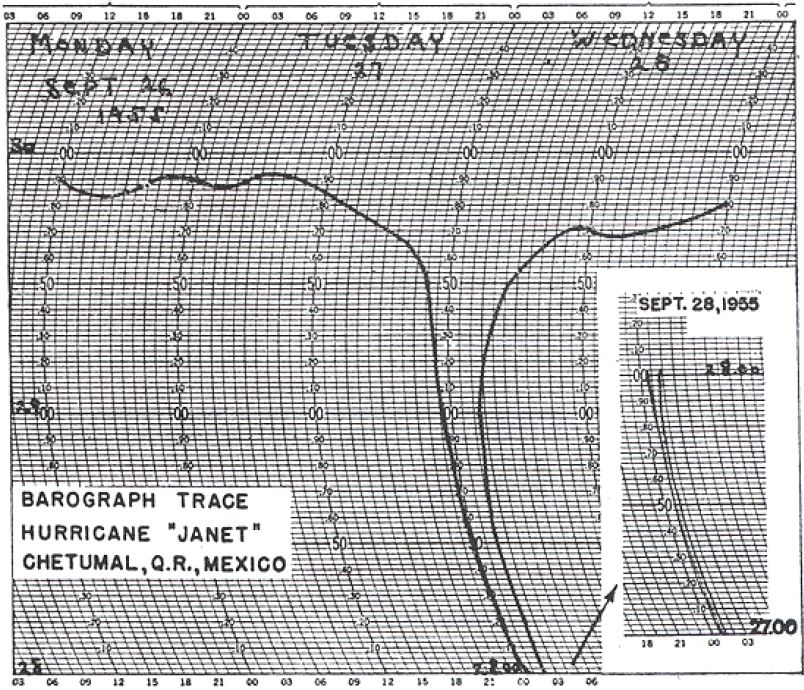
Graph of barometer readings in Chetumal

While trekking across the central Caribbean Sea, Janet was only slightly larger than while it was moving over the Windward Islands, with gale-force winds extending 125 miles (201 km) out from the center by September 25. Remaining a Category 4 hurricane as it moved erratically westward across the Caribbean, a reconnaissance flight mission during the night of September 25–26 indicated strong rainbands with frequent lightning strikes and a well-defined eye, evidence that the storm was once again rapidly intensifying. As it neared the Yucatán Peninsula on September 26, Janet began accelerating in forward speed. After the reconnaissance flight Snowcloud Five was lost while making a penetration into the hurricane's eye, another flight early on September 27 reported a minimum pressure of 938 mbar (27.7 inHg), with winds in excess of 115 mph (185 km/h) "by a large and incalculable amount." The hurricane was estimated to have intensified to Category 5 hurricane intensity—the highest rating on the modern-day Saffir–Simpson hurricane scale—at 1700 UTC on September 27, shortly before passing over the Swan Islands. Janet continued to intensify afterwards, eventually reaching its peak intensity with maximum sustained winds of 175 mph (282 km/h), with gale-force winds having expanded to at least 250 miles (400 km) away from the center of the hurricane. Janet maintained peak intensity as it made landfall in extreme southern Quintana Roo, Mexico, just east of Chetumal, Mexico. In that city, an anemometer at the airport reported winds of 175 mph (282 km/h) before being blown away, and a barometer indicated a minimum barometric pressure of 914 mbar (27.0 inHg) in the eye of Janet. At the time, this was the second-lowest pressure ever recorded on land in a landfalling Atlantic hurricane, behind the 1935 Labor Day hurricane, though Janet was later surpassed by hurricanes Dean and Gilbert, which also made landfall on the Yucatán Peninsula as Category 5 hurricanes.

Once over land, Janet considerably weakened to a Category 2 hurricane with winds of 105 mph (169 km/h). After crossing the Yucatán Peninsula with a forward speed of 21 mph (34 km/h), the hurricane emerged into the Bay of Campeche by 1600 UTC on September 28. The weakened hurricane marginally intensified as it crossed the Bay of Campeche to a secondary peak intensity of 110 mph (180 km/h) with a minimum central pressure of 950 mbar (28 inHg). Janet eventually made its final landfall 50 miles (80 km) north of the city of Veracruz by 2200 UTC on September 29 as a Category 2 hurricane. After moving inland, the hurricane became quickly disorganized due to the highly mountainous terrain of Mexico, and as a result the Weather Bureau issued its last advisory on Janet. The weakening system degenerated to tropical storm strength by September 30, and later dissipated over central Mexico by 0600 UTC that day. Janet's remnant circulation contributed to the development of a disturbed area of weather off the western coast of Mexico that would subsequently develop into a tropical storm on October 1.

== Preparations ==
=== Caribbean Islands ===
Upon Janet's formation east of the Windward Islands, the Weather Bureau office in San Juan, Puerto Rico advised small craft to remain in port and vessels in the path of the developing storm to exercise caution. After a reconnaissance flight reported much stronger winds than initially suggested, hurricane warnings were issued at 1600 UTC on September 22 for the entirety of the Lesser Antilles from Saint Lucia to Grenada, including Barbados. Storm warnings were issued for all islands in the Windward Islands from Saint Lucia south to Tobago, excluding St. Vincent and the Grenadines. All warnings in the Windward Antilles remained in effect until 1000 UTC on September 22. Shortly after warnings were lowered in the Windward Islands, storm warnings were issued for the ABC islands and the Paraguaná Peninsula of Venezuela at 0200 UTC on September 23. After Janet passed north of the islands, all storm warnings were lifted on the morning of September 25. The Weather Bureau later warned interests in Jamaica, but did not issue any hurricane-related warnings for the island.

=== Yucatán Peninsula and Mexico ===
The Weather Bureau first began cautioning areas of Central America at 1600 UTC on September 26, advising people in areas of northeast Nicaragua and Honduras to take precautionary measures, along with all vessels and small craft in the Gulf of Honduras south to Cabo Gracias a Dios. After Janet began accelerating towards the west-northwest, advisories warned areas in British Honduras and Quintana Roo of hurricane-related impacts. Though no official warnings were issued for areas of Central America, advisories published by the Weather Bureau cautioned interests in the hurricane's path up until landfall. Evacuations took place in several coastal towns in Quintana Roo upon notification of the oncoming storm. People were evacuated to inland hillside shelters. After the hurricane moved through the Yucatán Peninsula and entered the Bay of Campeche, the Weather Bureau alerted areas in the storm's path on the western side of Mexico's Gulf Coast. At the time, Janet was expected to make landfall between Veracruz and Tuxpan. Areas were warned of the storm's potential flooding and coastal impacts. The Weather Bureau advised all small craft south of Port O'Connor, Texas to remain in port. Notifications of Janet to potentially affected areas were stopped after the hurricane made landfall.

== Impact ==
Deaths and damage by region
Region	Total deaths	Damage(USD)	Source(s)
Barbados	38	$5 million	
British Honduras	16	$5 million	
Grenadines	122	$3.8 million	
Hurricane Hunters	11	N/A	
Quintana Roo	500	$40 million	
Sonora	0	$12 million	
Tamaulipas	326	Unknown	
Tobago	10	Unknown	
Veracruz	Unknown	Unknown	
Totals:	1,023+	$65.8 million	
Because of differing sources, totals may not match.

During its existence, areas of the Lesser Antilles, ABC islands, and Central America were affected by Janet. At least $65.8 million in damages and 1,023 deaths were caused by the hurricane, mostly in Quintana Roo. The large number of deaths and damage caused by Janet helped make the 1955 Atlantic hurricane season the deadliest and costliest hurricane season documented since comprehensive record of such statistics began in 1942.

=== Lesser Antilles ===
As a small but rapidly intensifying hurricane, Janet passed just south of Barbados on September 22, becoming the first hurricane to strike the island in 57 years, since the 1898 Windward Islands Hurricane, until Hurricane Elsa struck the island in 2021. Maximum sustained winds on the south side of the island were estimated to be between 110–120 mph (180–190 km/h). The strong winds knocked out communication lines, preventing officials from accurately enumerating casualties on the island, though communications were still maintained by commercial cable companies and amateur radio. Electric power was later restored, allowing newspapers to publish information on the storm. Sugar cane, the island country's main source of revenue, was severely damaged, with losses estimated to be in excess of $1 million. Poorly constructed dwellings were blown apart by the strong winds. An estimated 8,100 homes were damaged by the hurricane. The destroyed buildings and trees blocked highways, and the Seawell Airport was forced to close. Heavy rains peaked at 4 inches (100 mm) and a storm surge of 7 feet (2.1 m) swept away low-lying houses along the coast. An estimated 2,000 people were left homeless due to the hurricane. Property damage on Barbados was estimated to be $5 million, and at least 57 people were killed.

On September 23 Janet passed directly between Grenada and Carriacou in the Grenadines, killing 122 people in the island chain. An airport on Grenada was covered in debris strewn by the strong winds. Eight people were killed in a small town adjacent to the airport. Strong winds were also reported to have destroyed docks and warehouses, and unroofed a hotel in St. George's, Grenada. Houses were also unroofed, and balconies of government offices in St. George's were torn off. All bridges in the island's interior regions collapsed, and spice crops sustained heavy damage. An estimated 75% of nutmeg plantations were destroyed, along with nearly all of the island's banana and cocoa crops. Three ships were also grounded in the local harbor. In The Carenage, the waterfront region of St. George's, debris was scattered and an 820-foot (250 m) pier collapsed. St. Vincent was mostly destroyed, and St. Lucia suffered significant coastal damage. Over $2.8 million in damages were estimated throughout the Grenadines. Farther south, in Port of Spain, a church being used as a storm shelter collapsed, killing ten people.

Hurricane Janet skirted the ABC islands with strong winds as it passed to the north from September 24–25. In Aruba, gusts peaked at 50 mph (80 km/h), uprooting trees. However, damage outside of trees was primarily insignificant. In Bonaire, piers were destroyed, and the island's coastal boulevard was damaged. Beach facilities at Curaçao's Piscadera and Vaersen Bays suffered considerable damage. Quays along the harbor entrance were also damaged.

==== Snowcloud Five ====
On September 26, the hurricane hunter P2V-3W Neptune aircraft Snowcloud Five, led by U.S. Navy Lieutenant Commander Grover B. Windham, was sent from Guantánamo Bay to investigate Janet, which was at the time a Category 4 hurricane south of Jamaica. Upon penetration of the hurricane's eyewall at an altitude of 700 feet (210 m), a final transmission was received from the reconnaissance flight before it presumably crashed in the Caribbean Sea. All 11 people on board, including nine crew members and two journalists, were killed. Following the loss of the plane, an extensive search and rescue operation took place over a large area of the Caribbean Sea, with 3,000 personnel involved with the search, returning no results. The exact cause of the crash remains unknown, though it is speculated that the plane's altimeter gave an incorrect reading due to the low surrounding barometric pressure or that the excess workload placed on one of the crew members due to another crew member having been replaced by one of the reporters caused him to lose track of the plane's height above the water. Although four hurricane reconnaissance flights have been lost since operations began in 1943, Snowcloud Five remains the only known loss of a reconnaissance aircraft as a result of a hurricane in the Atlantic basin, with the other three occurring as a result of Pacific typhoons.

=== Yucatán Peninsula ===
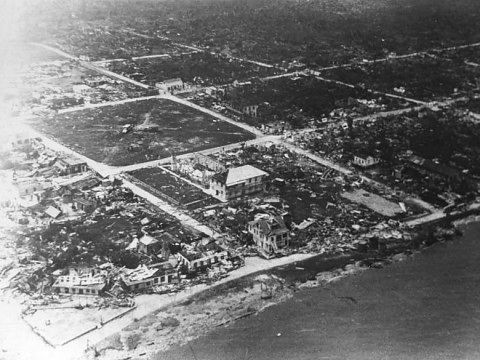
Damage in Corozal Town

As it approached the Yucatán Peninsula, Janet passed over the Swan Islands north of Honduras as a Category 5 hurricane on September 27. The hurricane caused rough seas, and strong winds uprooted trees and antennas. After gusts exceeded an estimated 100 mph (160 km/h), officials on the islands took shelter in a Navy seismograph building. Though no deaths were reported, Janet destroyed almost all buildings on the islands. The U.S. Weather Bureau and Civil Aeronautics Authority requested food and supplies for 82 people on the island after the storm passed.

==== Quintana Roo ====
After passing the Swan Islands, Janet made landfall on the Yucatán Peninsula between Corozal Town, British Honduras, and Chetumal, Mexico, at 1700 UTC on September 28. At the time, it had winds of 175 mph (282 km/h). Hurricane-force winds were reported for two hours preceding the hurricane's landfall, with numerous pressure readings below 948 mbar (28.0 inHg). Roads and crops on the peninsula sustained heavy damage due to Janet. In Xcalak, Quintana Roo the strong winds from Janet flattened the port's infrastructure, and only one house remained intact after the storm's passage. 97 people were killed in Xcalak, constituting more than a third of the port's population. Chetumal, Mexico was devastated, with only four buildings left standing. Storm surge pushed water to a depth of 6.5 feet (2.0 m), 1,600 feet (490 m) inland, despite the peninsula protecting the city from the open ocean. The death toll in Chetumal remains uncertain; 120 bodies were recovered in the city but it is unknown how many were ever found. An additional 10,000 people in the city were left homeless after the hurricane, and were forced to sleep in the open overnight. Federal relief agencies previously providing service for areas affected by Hurricanes Gladys and Hilda earlier in the year in western areas of the Gulf Coast of Mexico were ordered to extend relief operations to the Yucatán Peninsula. In Quintana Roo, Hurricane Janet was estimated to have caused $40 million in damages and at least 500 deaths, the most of any region affected by Janet.

==== British Honduras ====
Making landfall near the border between Mexico and British Honduras, the latter colony's Corozal and Orange Walk districts, containing a population of 15,500 at the time, experienced severe devastation from Janet. Strong hurricane winds knocked down and damaged numerous trees across British Honduras, particularly in the Freshwater Creek Forest Preserve. There, an estimated 30% of all trees had been damaged, especially mahogany and sapodilla trees. Hurricane Janet also caused extensive damage to crops, with an estimated $2.631 million in damages. Fruit trees, maize, and sugar cane crops suffered the most damage. Sugar cane was expected to have a 20% decrease in yield due to the damage sustained after the storm. Pineapple crops and livestock experienced less significant losses. To a lesser extent, the hurricane also affected the Belize District and several of British Honduras' offshore cayes. Similar to Corozal and Orange Walk Districts, corn, trees, and coconut experienced the most severe damage of any crop.

In Corozal Town, British Honduras, south of where Janet made landfall, 500 people were made homeless, and six people were killed. About 90% of all buildings in the town were destroyed, and communications were knocked out by the strong winds. Based on an average home cost of $2,000, it was estimated that property damage to homes in Corozal Town totaled $800,000. Much of Santa Elena, British Honduras was also flattened by the strong winds. Farther south in Belize City, winds peaked at 60 mph (97 km/h), though no damage was reported. In British Honduras, the hurricane's effects were less deadly than in Quintana Roo, but in northern portions of the colony the storm killed 16 people and caused $5 million in damages.

=== Mainland Mexico ===
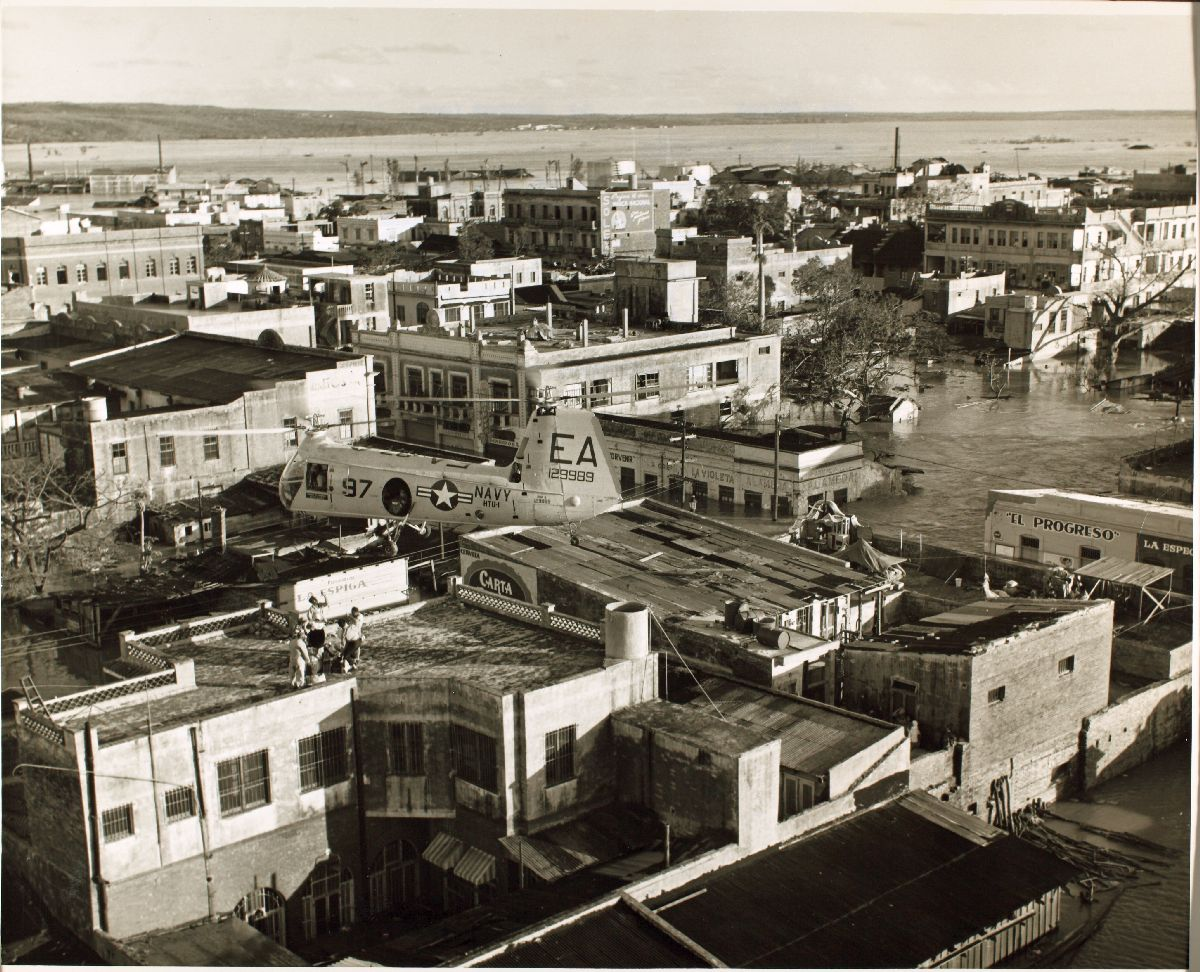
Helicopter observing flood damage in Tampico

While in the Bay of Campeche, the shrimp boat Celestino Arias was sunken by strong waves generated by Janet after it suffered engine failures. The stranded ship was heavily damaged by the hurricane's strong winds in the bay, which broke towing lines. All of the ship's crewmen, which had evacuated the boat after it sunk, were later rescued and brought back to Tampa, Florida. Along the coast, tides were reported to be 3–4 feet (0.91–1.22 m) above average. Farther north along the Texas coast, tides were 2 feet (0.61 m) above average, blocking beach roads near Corpus Christi.

Janet made its final landfall in the Mexican state of Veracruz between the cities of Nautla and Veracruz as a Category 2 hurricane at 2200 UTC on September 29. In Nautla, communications were cut by strong winds from the hurricane. The strong winds also caused a relief plane to crash, causing five deaths. Heavy rains in the Tampico, Tamaulipas area added to floods caused by hurricanes Gladys and Hilda earlier in the year. The resulting flood was reported by the Weather Bureau office in New Orleans to be one of the worst natural disasters in Mexican history. In Tampico, 16 inches (410 mm) of rain was reported. The floods contributed to a localized typhoid fever and dysentery outbreak, causing over 1,000 people to evacuate out of the city to prevent further spreading of the diseases. An additional 36,000 people were being cared for in concentration centers. Although located south of where Janet made landfall, areas of Veracruz were inundated by strong storm surge, including the city's main streets and port. Operations along a railroad stretching from Laredo, Texas to Mexico City were stopped, after having just reopened due to Hurricane Hilda.

Farther inland, as Janet dissipated over the mountainous central Mexico, the storm dropped torrential rainfall over the Tamesí and Pánuco River basins. The water levels in the Panuco River remained above flood stage for four weeks. In Tampico, the river flooded neighborhoods, forcing cables to be stretched along roads to prevent people from being swept away. Small boats were also sent to monitor streets. According to some sources, 800 people died from the floods, with thousands more being stranded in the city. Tamazunchale was inundated by an overflowing Moctezuma River. The rains caused a landslide in Colonia San Rafael, killing 12 people. Heavy rains also impacted Guadalajara, which had previously not been affected by any tropical cyclones earlier in the year. In Maltarana, Jalisco, the Lerma and Duero Rivers overflowed, forcing 800 people in the town to evacuate. Farther north, in Sonora, cotton crops damaged by Janet were estimated to amount to $12 million in damages. Combined property damage in Mexico from Hurricanes Gladys, Hilda, and Janet was estimated to total $200 million, nearly half of the government's 1955 national budget. Although there were no official damage or fatality estimates, at least 1,000 people were injured and another 100,000 people were made homeless on the Mexican mainland due to Janet.

== Aftermath ==
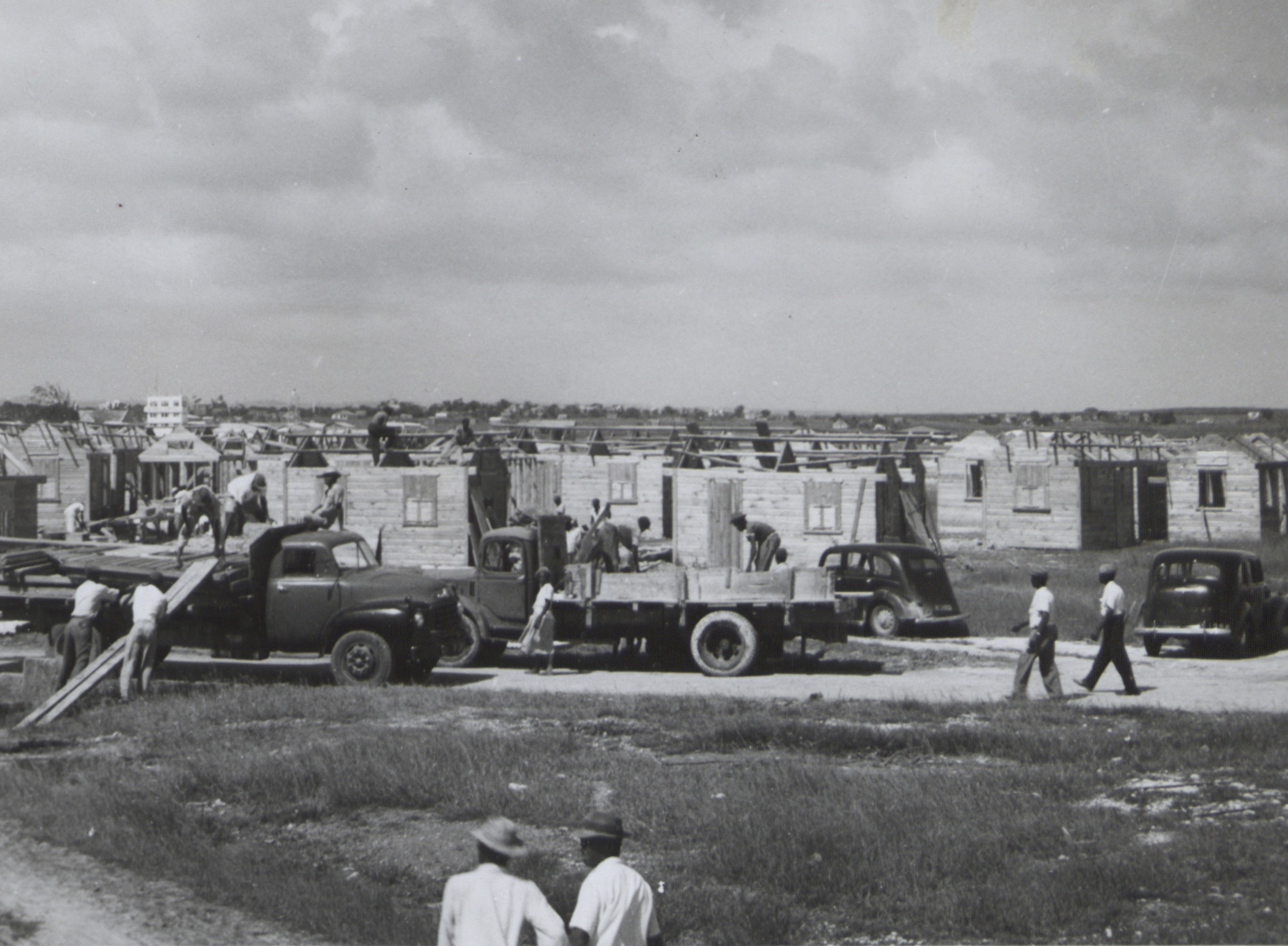
Neighborhood being rebuilt in Barbados

=== Lesser Antilles ===
After Janet passed Barbados, the island was declared to be in a state of emergency. Relief workers on Barbados helped to clean up debris scattered by the strong winds on highways, and the local government made requests for food and construction materials. The extensive damaged caused by Janet on the island to low-income households led the passage of the 1955 Housing Act, which created the National Housing Authority (NHA) in 1956. The NHA was responsible for the acquisition of lands on which houses could be built with stronger and more permanent materials, which was thought to minimize maintenance costs and hurricane-related damage. The newly founded organization quickly worked to rebuild homes after the hurricane struck.

In Grenada, the island's governor issued an emergency order against the hoarding of food in the aftermath of Janet, due to the food and water shortage that resulted from Janet. A United States destroyer and a British frigate were sent to bring relief supplies to Grenada, and ships departing from Jamaica and Trinidad were redirected to the island to help send supplies. The British government later announced that it would send £50,000 (US$155,000) in relief to the Grenadines. (Note: Conversions from British Pounds to United States Dollars were done using a currency converter with an exchange date of September 29, 1955.) The Crown Agents and Red Cross delivered relief supplies to Barbados and the Grenadines, which included aluminum roofing sheets and portable electric generators.

=== British Honduras and Mexico ===
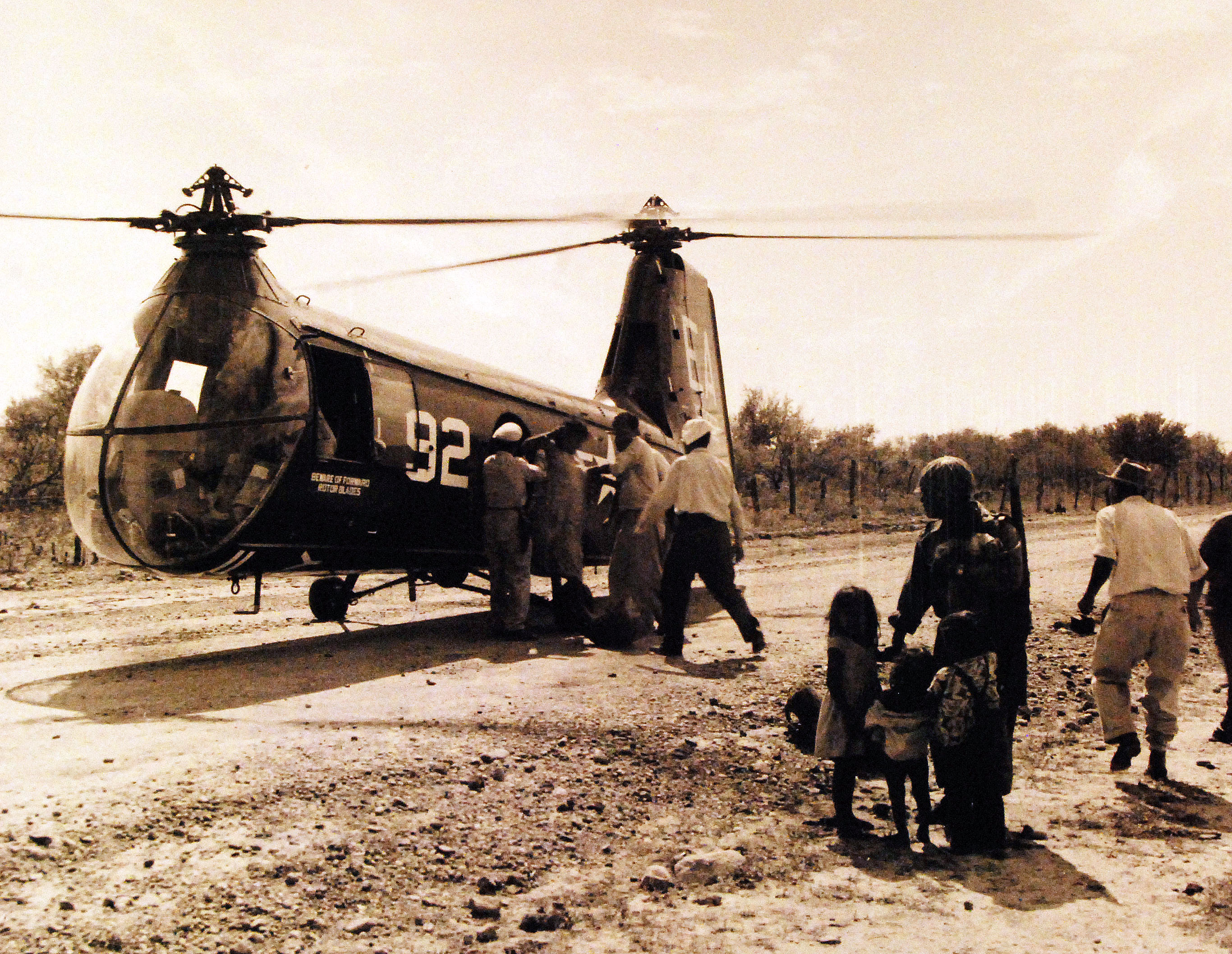
A HUP Retriever on disaster relief mission in Mexico for Hurricane Janet

Relief and reconstruction measures were enacted in the British Honduras beginning on September 30. A large-scale reconstruction program was initiated by the government to help rebuild 48 villages. The government also declared a state of emergency for Corozal, Orange Walk, and Belize administrative districts, including a ban on liquor sales. Temporary communication lines were rebuilt, which initially only allowed official communications with affected areas. Due to the severity of the damage in Corozal, an airstrip was built to help deliver relief to the city more efficiently. Food depots in Corozal, Louisville, and Orange Walk Town were tasked with distributing food. The potential for widespread disease following the devastation wrought by Janet forced a widespread vaccination initiative against typhoid fever in affected areas. The Jamaican government sent £20,000 (US$55,000) to the colony in relief funds, while the British government sent £40,000 (US$110,000) to affected areas in the British Honduras and other affected islands in the Caribbean. The United States sent the cargo ship USS Antares, which supplied the colony with various relief materials. In Corozal Town, a $3.5 million grant was given to land surveyor H.C. Fairweather to plan and reconstruct the township.

A U.S. Navy relief plane was sent to Chetumal, Mexico, to deliver food and other relief supplies after Janet struck the region. In areas previously affected by hurricanes Gladys and Hilda earlier in the year, federal relief agencies were ordered to extend relief operations to the Yucatán Peninsula. However, after crossing the Bay of Campeche and making landfall near Veracruz, relief measures were once again implemented in the western Gulf Coast of Mexico. The Mexican Air Force, commercial and private planes, and helicopters were sent to bring relief supplies and airlift refugees. The United States initiated the largest relief campaign ever staged in Mexico at the time. Various government and relief agencies, including the American Red Cross and The Salvation Army, participated in the relief efforts. The U.S. Air Force and United States Army began a joint-relief operation to send relief supplies to the Tampico area, beginning with the deployment of a Curtiss C-46 Commando from the Harlingen Air Force Base on October 1. Ten other military transport aircraft from the U.S. Air Force were sent from Texas to provide food and clothing. Pan American World Airways sent a Boeing 314 from Miami, Florida to evacuate victims. Helicopters were sent from the USS Saipan to transfer food and medical supplies from the light aircraft carrier. Other ships also aided in delivering supplies, including the USS Siboney, which also deployed helicopters to assist in relief efforts. By October 6, 1,500 people were estimated to have been rescued from the Tampico area, and at least 280,000 lb (130,000 kg) of food and clothing materials were estimated to have been delivered by the US Air Force to the city. There, typhoid serum shots were administered as a precautionary measure. Former president Manuel Ávila Camacho died of a heart ailment, in part due to over-exertion in helping in the relief efforts.

=== Retirement ===
Due to the destruction and loss of life left in its wake, the name Janet was retired by the U.S. Weather Bureau following the 1955 season. It was one of four names retired that year. Janet was also the first category five storm name and the first name beginning with the letter J to retire in the Atlantic basin.

The name Janet appeared on the designated storm name lists for 1960, 1964, and 1968 but was never used in those years. In 1969, a policy change permanently retired Janet. No name replacement was selected for Janet as the four-year lists used then were replaced in 1971 by a new series of 10 lists running through 1980 before recycling.

== See also ==
- Lists of Atlantic hurricanes
- List of Category 5 Atlantic hurricanes
- List of Mexico hurricanes

- Hurricane Carmen (1974)
- Hurricane Gilbert (1988)
- Hurricane Keith (2000)
- Hurricane Dean (2007)

- Hurricane Elsa (2021) – The next tropical cyclone to produce hurricane conditions on Barbados
