= Tizapán el Alto =

Tizapán El Alto
- Municipality and town
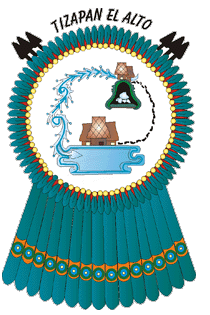
- Coat of arms

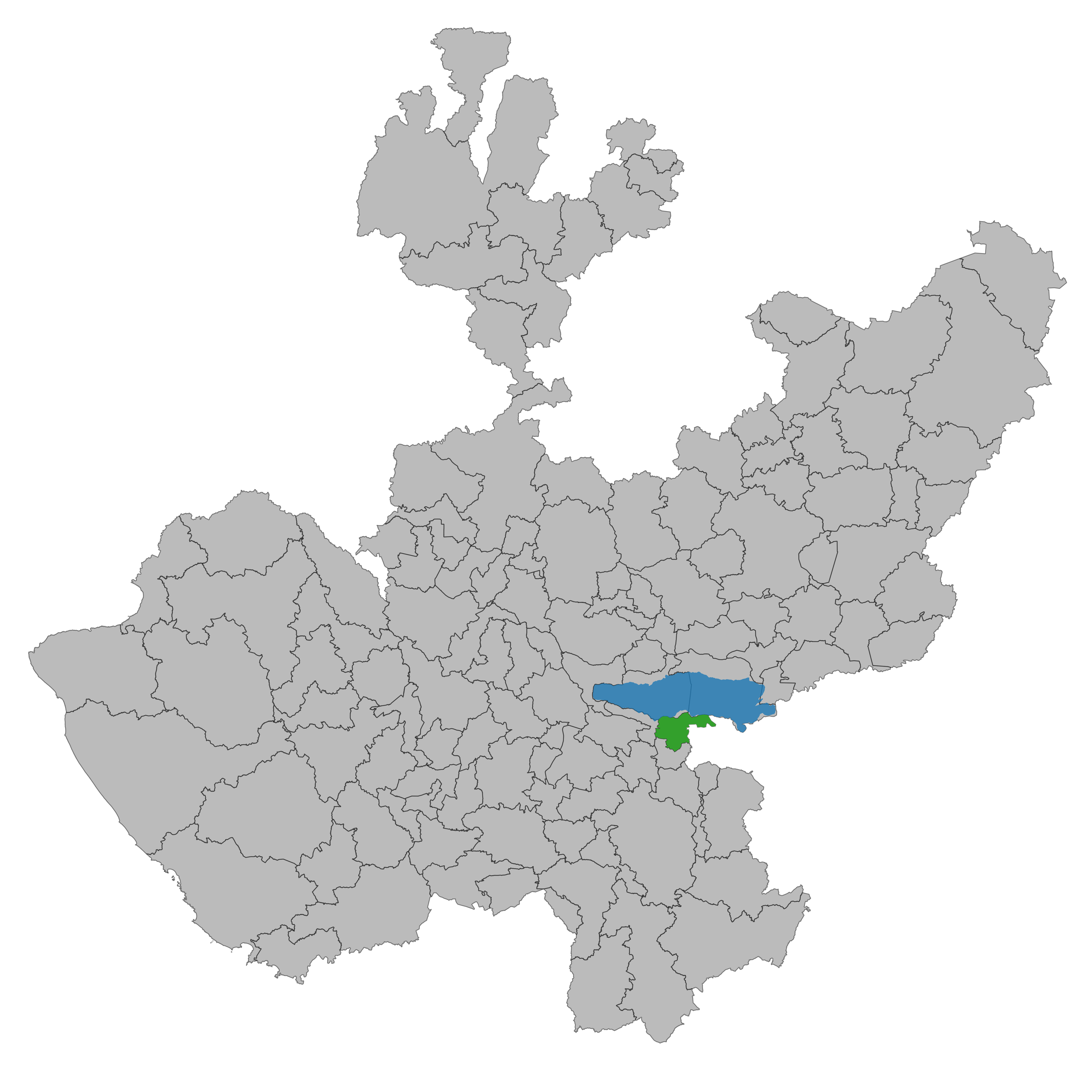
- Location of the municipality in Jalisco

- Location in Mexico
- Coordinates: 20°09′31.2″N 103°02′35.7″W
- Country: Mexico
- State: Jalisco
- Date of Foundation: December 29, 1529~

Government
  - Type: Municipal government
  - Municipal president: Martín Silva Ramírez; MC

Area
  - Total: 273.32 km^{2} (105.53 sq mi)
  - Town: 5.1 km^{2} (2.0 sq mi)

Population (2020)
  - Total: 22,758
  - Density: 83.265/km^{2} (215.66/sq mi)
  - Town: 16,224
  - Town density: 3,200/km^{2} (8,200/sq mi)
- Time zone: UTC-6 (Central Standard Time)
- C.P: 49400
- Area code: 376
- Website: www.jalisco.gob.mx/es/jalisco/municipios/tizapan-el-alto

Tizapán El Alto is a town and municipality, in Jalisco in central-western Mexico. The municipality covers an area of 105.53 square miles (273.32 km^{2}).

As of 2020, the municipality had a total population of 22,758.

== Toponymy ==
Tizapán means "place of chalk" ("lugar de tiza"), due to the banks of that non-metallic mineral that exist around; or, "water over the tizate" (the tizate is a shrub up to 20 feet tall, with a very white trunk and stems; ovate, lanceolate, rough leaves with jagged edges, and yellow flowers in heads. The decoction of the leaves and the root is used in traditional medicine).

== History ==
According to some scholars of anthropology, due to the pre-Cortesian vestiges that exist, the Toltecs inhabited this region without being able to specify exactly the date on which the settlements that were formed both in what is today the municipal seat and in its vicinity took place. Some affirm that back in the 7th century of our era, various tribes began to settle on the banks of Lake Chapala and also of the river today called La Pasión. Oral tradition indicates that, after the conquest, a mixed congregation was formed, that is, of Indian and Spanish origin and indicates the date of December 29, 1529, since Don Alonso de Ávalos, cousin of Hernán Cortés and closely linked in interests to the conqueror, had already passed through these lands. The same tradition indicates as petitioners of the legal estate the Spaniards Juan de la Salud, Lorenzo Manuel Taracho Tadeo, Bernardino de los Reyes, Pedro Joseph, Concepción de los Ángeles, Silvestre de los Santos, Ignacio Cupertino and Cristóbal Nolasco, as well as the indigenous Roque Jorge, Franco Javier, Diego Salvador, Gregorio Magdaleno and Juan Evangelista. All of them with their respective families that multiplied until they formed what was then called the Estancia de Tizapán and several decades later San Francisco Tizapán. On March 27, 1824, it was assigned to the canton of Sayula, and to the department of Zacoalco. In 1825 he continues to belong politically to Sayula and the 3rd. Department of Zacoalco, having under its jurisdiction the Haciendas of Santa Ana and San Francisco Javier, adjacent to its head. In 1837, in the jurisdiction of Sayula belonging to Zapotlán el Grande. In 1843 it belongs to the 4th District of Sayula and to the first party of that city. In 1878, always belonging to Sayula, it passed to the 2nd Department of Zacoalco. In 1886, by decree of General Ramón Corona, at the same time Governor of the State, Tuxcueca was segregated from Tizapán, to become a municipality. In 1886, La Manzanilla was integrated as a Police Station and in 1890, Decree 426, created the Civil Registry Office, being included, within the designated police station, the ranches of La Tuna Manza, Las Cuevas, Agua Escondida, La Cañada, La Soledad, La Peña, and Palos Verdes. In 1896, it became part of the 7th Canton of Chapala by decree 747 of December 30 of that same year. In 1906, by decree of Governor Miguel Ahumada, the La Manzanilla Police Station became a municipality. In 1924, the Estancia de Columba was erected as a police station and in 1947 that of El Volantín. The municipality has the municipal seat, 2 delegations and 9 municipal agencies.

== Geography ==
=== Location ===
Tizapán el Alto is located in the Southeast region of the state of Jalisco, between coordinates 20°02′40″ — 20°56′15″ north latitude and 102°36′06″ — 103°09′40″ west longitude; at a height of 5026 feet meters above sea level.

The municipality borders to the north with the Lake Chapala and the municipalities of Chapala and Poncitlán; to the east with the State of Michoacán; to the south with the municipality of La Manzanilla de la Paz, and to the west with the municipality of Tuxcueca.

=== Climate ===
The climate in Tizapán in summer is warm semi-humid with occasional rains reaching a maximum of 86°F. During the winter it is cold, with winter showers reaching a minimum of 44.6°F. The average annual rainfall is 112.5 dcl per season. During the fall and the spring it is usually semi-humid with occasional intermittent showers. Average annual temperature of 75°F.

Climate data for Tizapán el Alto (1991–2020 normals, extremes 1973–present)
| Month | Jan | Feb | Mar | Apr | May | Jun | Jul | Aug | Sep | Oct | Nov | Dec | Year |
|---|---|---|---|---|---|---|---|---|---|---|---|---|---|
| Record high °C (°F) | 29 (84) | 32 (90) | 36 (97) | 38 (100) | 37.5 (99.5) | 39.5 (103.1) | 36 (97) | 32 (90) | 35.5 (95.9) | 36 (97) | 31 (88) | 30 (86) | 39.5 (103.1) |
| Mean daily maximum °C (°F) | 23.0 (73.4) | 25.3 (77.5) | 27.9 (82.2) | 30.3 (86.5) | 31.6 (88.9) | 29.5 (85.1) | 27.0 (80.6) | 26.9 (80.4) | 26.5 (79.7) | 26.1 (79.0) | 25.3 (77.5) | 23.8 (74.8) | 26.9 (80.4) |
| Daily mean °C (°F) | 16.1 (61.0) | 18.0 (64.4) | 20.2 (68.4) | 22.3 (72.1) | 24.0 (75.2) | 23.4 (74.1) | 21.7 (71.1) | 21.5 (70.7) | 21.2 (70.2) | 20.2 (68.4) | 18.5 (65.3) | 16.8 (62.2) | 20.3 (68.5) |
| Mean daily minimum °C (°F) | 9.2 (48.6) | 10.7 (51.3) | 12.5 (54.5) | 14.3 (57.7) | 16.4 (61.5) | 17.3 (63.1) | 16.4 (61.5) | 16.2 (61.2) | 15.9 (60.6) | 14.3 (57.7) | 11.7 (53.1) | 9.8 (49.6) | 13.7 (56.7) |
| Record low °C (°F) | 1.5 (34.7) | 0.5 (32.9) | 4.5 (40.1) | 0.9 (33.6) | 0.9 (33.6) | 11 (52) | 10 (50) | 9.5 (49.1) | 8.5 (47.3) | 6 (43) | 3 (37) | 1.5 (34.7) | 0.5 (32.9) |
| Average precipitation mm (inches) | 11.9 (0.47) | 9.3 (0.37) | 7.4 (0.29) | 7.3 (0.29) | 21.8 (0.86) | 165.1 (6.50) | 151.5 (5.96) | 130.9 (5.15) | 124.6 (4.91) | 52.3 (2.06) | 11.0 (0.43) | 6.3 (0.25) | 699.4 (27.54) |
| Average precipitation days | 1.3 | 1.1 | 1.0 | 1.7 | 2.3 | 11.8 | 14.0 | 13.9 | 11.2 | 4.4 | 1.4 | 0.9 | 65.0 |
Source: Servicio Meteorológico Nacional

=== Hydrography ===
Its hydrological resources are provided by the river of La Pasión; through the streams: San José, San Vicente, El Bosque, El Laurel, El Refugio, Las Mesas, Los Coyotes, Las Moscas, El Mezquitillo, El Regadío, Zarco, La Soltera, and Las Trancas; also, the Lake Chapala and the dams: El Volantín, El Refugio, Los Cuatro, and Palos Altos.

=== Topography ===
Half of its surface is made up of flat areas (50%), with elevations ranging from 4,920 to 5,250 feet above sea level; semi-flat areas make up 40% of the surface, with elevations ranging from 5,250 to 5,905 feet asl, and rugged areas (10%) with heights ranging from 5,950 to 6,890 feet asl.

=== Soils ===
The territory is made up of land belonging to the Quaternary period. The composition of the soils is predominantly Vertisol Pélic and Chromic types, Nitosol Humic and Feozem Haplic. The municipality has a land area of 67,540 acres (27,332 hectares), of which 33,940 acres are used for agricultural purposes, 18,118 for livestock, 6,425 for forestry, 690 for urban land, and 8,365 for other uses. As far as property is concerned, an extension of 23,267 acres is private and another of 44,271 is ejido. There is no communal property.

=== Flora and fauna ===
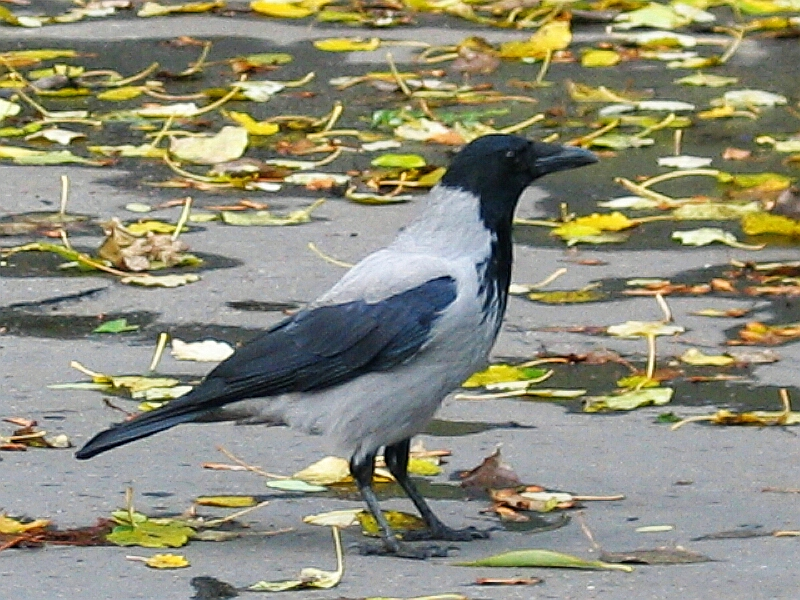
Crow.

Its vegetation is basically made up of oak, huisache, palo dulce, juniper, nopal, spiny hackberry, tepame and other species. Tizapán has grassland vegetation, pine-oak forest to the south, and to the north lies the Lake Chapala.

Deer, coyote, rabbit, hare, squirrel, fox, armadillo, badger, opossum, black vulture, crow, and other minor species inhabit this region.

== Economy ==
Livestock: bovines, equines, goats, pigs, beehives.
Agriculture: stand out corn, beans, sorghum, broccoli, onion, cabbage.
Commerce: establishments dedicated to the sale of basic necessities and mixed stores that sell various items predominate.
Mining: it has deposits of stone quarry, sand, gold, silver and gravel.

== Towns ==
- Tizapán el Alto — municipal seat

There are two delegations:

- Ejido Modelo, known also as Villa Emiliano Zapata
- El Volantín

There are nine municipal agencies:

- Churintzio
- Colonia Madero
- El Refugio
- El Zapote
- La Cañada
- La Rosa Amarilla
- Los Sauces
- Mismaloya
- Villa del Lago
- La Reserva

== Government ==
=== Municipal presidents ===
| Municipal president | Term | Political party | Notes |
| Blas Ortega | 1867–1868 | | |
| N/A | 1869–1874 | | |
| Felipe Zapién | 1875 | | |
| Serapio Neri | 1876 | | |
| José María Navarrete | 1877 | | |
| Francisco de P. Arias | 1878 | | |
| Rafael Vera | 1879 | | |
| Felipe Macías | 1880 | | |
| Bernardino Magaña | 1881–1882 | | |
| Luis Anguiano | 1883 | | |
| Cecilio Beltrán | 1884–1885 | | |
| Tiburcio Castillo | 1886 | | |
| Eligio Sánchez | 1887 | | |
| Tiburcio Castillo | 1888 | | |
| Ignacio Anaya | 1889 | | |
| Raúl Magaña | 1890 | | |
| Ignacio Anaya | 1891 | | |
| Eligio Sánchez | 1892 | | |
| Norberto Vázquez | 1893 | | |
| Ignacio Anaya | 1894 | | |
| Lauro Magaña | 1894 | | |
| Eligio Sánchez | 1895 | | |
| Felipe Macías | 1896 | | |
| Mariano Moreno | 1897 | | |
| A.D. Martínez | 1898 | | |
| Eligio Sánchez | 1898 | | |
| Jesús Zambrano | 1899 | | |
| Agustín Guízar Barrios | 1900 | | |
| Timoteo Ruiz | 1900 | | |
| Aureliano Alcocer | 1900 | | |
| Agustín Guízar Barrios | 1900 | | |
| Timoteo Ruiz | 1901 | | |
| Antonio Guerra y Zepeda | 1902 | | |
| Ramón Amezcua | 1903 | | |
| Timoteo Ruiz | 1904 | | |
| Francisco de P. Arias | 1905 | | |
| Zacarías Cárdenas | 1906 | | |
| Rafael Chávez | 1907 | | |
| Evaristo Flores | 1908 | | |
| Rafael Chávez | 1909–1911 | | |
| Salvador de la Cerda Rocha | 1912 | | |
| Francisco Jiménez Michel | 1913 | | |
| N/A | 1914–1948 | | |
| Ramón Garza Madrigal | 1949 | PRI | |
| Mauro Torres Aguilar | 01-01-1950–31-12-1952 | PRI | |
| Severo Cortés Barajas | 01-01-1953–31-12-1955 | PRI | |
| Ernesto Zepeda Beltrán | 01-01-1956–1957 | PRI | |
| Miguel Hernández Ruiz | 1957–1958 | PRI | |
| Carlos Moreno Ruiz | 1959 | PRI | |
| Luis Castañeda Navarro | 1960–1961 | PRI | |
| J. Jesús Rubio Neri | 01-01-1962–31-12-1964 | PRI | |
| Pablo Anaya Díaz | 01-01-1965–31-12-1967 | PRI | |
| José Ma. Sotelo Anaya | 01-01-1968–31-12-1970 | PRI | |
| David García Haro | 01-01-1971–31-12-1973 | PRI | |
| Luis Flores García | 01-01-1974–31-12-1976 | PRI | |
| Gilberto Reyes Madriz | 01-01-1977–31-12-1979 | PRI | |
| Salvador Cárdenas García | 01-01-1980–31-12-1982 | PRI | |
| Cutberto Moreno Alcántar | 01-01-1983–31-12-1985 | PST | |
| Jesús Berrospe Díaz | 01-01-1986–31-12-1988 | PRI | |
| J. Santos Degollado Zepeda | 01-01-1989–1992 | PRI | |
| Salvador Cárdenas García | 1992–1995 | PRI | |
| Austreberto Anaya Anguianoi | 1995–1997 | PRI | |
| Alfredo Flores Castañeda | 01-01-1998–31-12-2000 | PRI | |
| Ernesto Ochoa Buenrostro | 01-01-2001–31-12-2003 | PAN | |
| Alfredo Flores Castañeda | 01-01-2004–31-12-2006 | PRI | |
| Ramón Martínez Morfín | 01-01-2007–31-12-2009 | PRI | |
| Salvador Ávalos Cárdenas | 01-01-2010–30-09-2012 | PAN | |
| Ramón Martínez Morfín | 01-10-2012–30-09-2015 | PRI; PVEM | Coalition "Compromise for Jalisco" |
| José Santiago Coronado Valencia | 01-10-2015–30-03-2018 | PRI | Applied for a temporary leave to run for reelection, which he got |
| Alfredo Martínez Enciso | 30-03-2018–2018 | PRI | Acting municipal president |
| José Santiago Coronado Valencia | 01-10-2018–30-09-2021 | PRI | Was reelected on 1 July 2018 |
| Martín Silva Ramírez | 01-10-2021– | MC | |
