= Isla de los Alacranes =

Island in Lake Chapala

Coordinates: 20°15′4″N 103°10′13″W

- Etymology: Scorpions’ island

Geography
- Location: Lake Chapala

Isla de los Alacranes (Scorpion Island) is an island in Lake Chapala, in the Mexican state of Jalisco.

It is so called because it is shaped as a scorpion. Many Mexican people use the word "alacrán" for the smaller, most venomous species of scorpion, which are very common in Mexico, while the word "escorpión" is used to describe the larger, darker and less venomous species.
