= Huaracha River =

Location
- Country: Mexico

The Huaracha River (Spanish: Río Huaracha) is a river of Mexico.

== See also ==
- List of rivers of Mexico
