= Zula River =

Coordinates: 20.4453°N 102.75°W

Location
- Country: Mexico

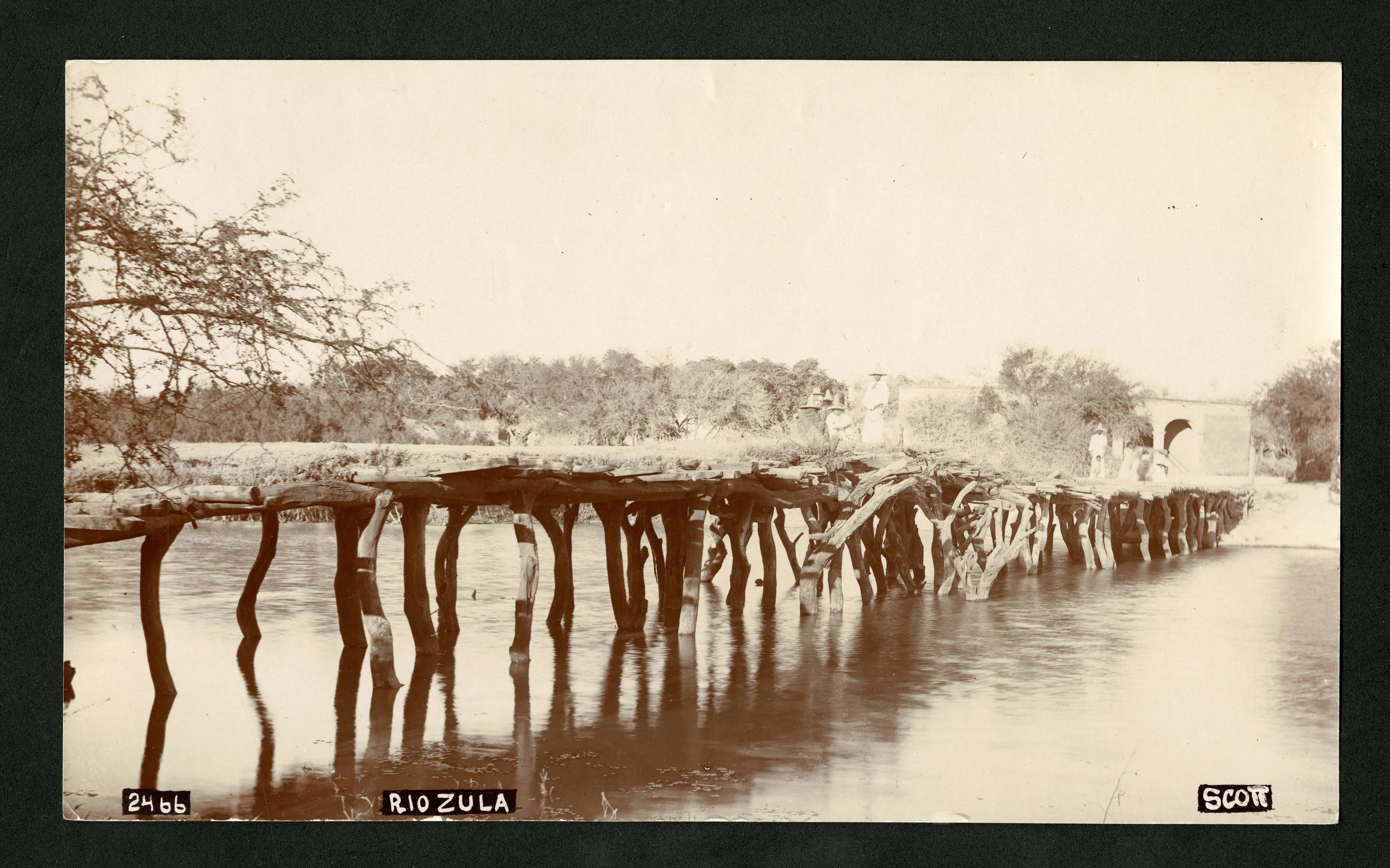

The Zula River (Spanish: Río Zula) is a river of Mexico.

== See also ==
- List of rivers of Mexico
