= Valle de Juárez =

- Municipality and town
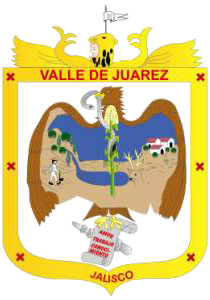
- Coat of arms

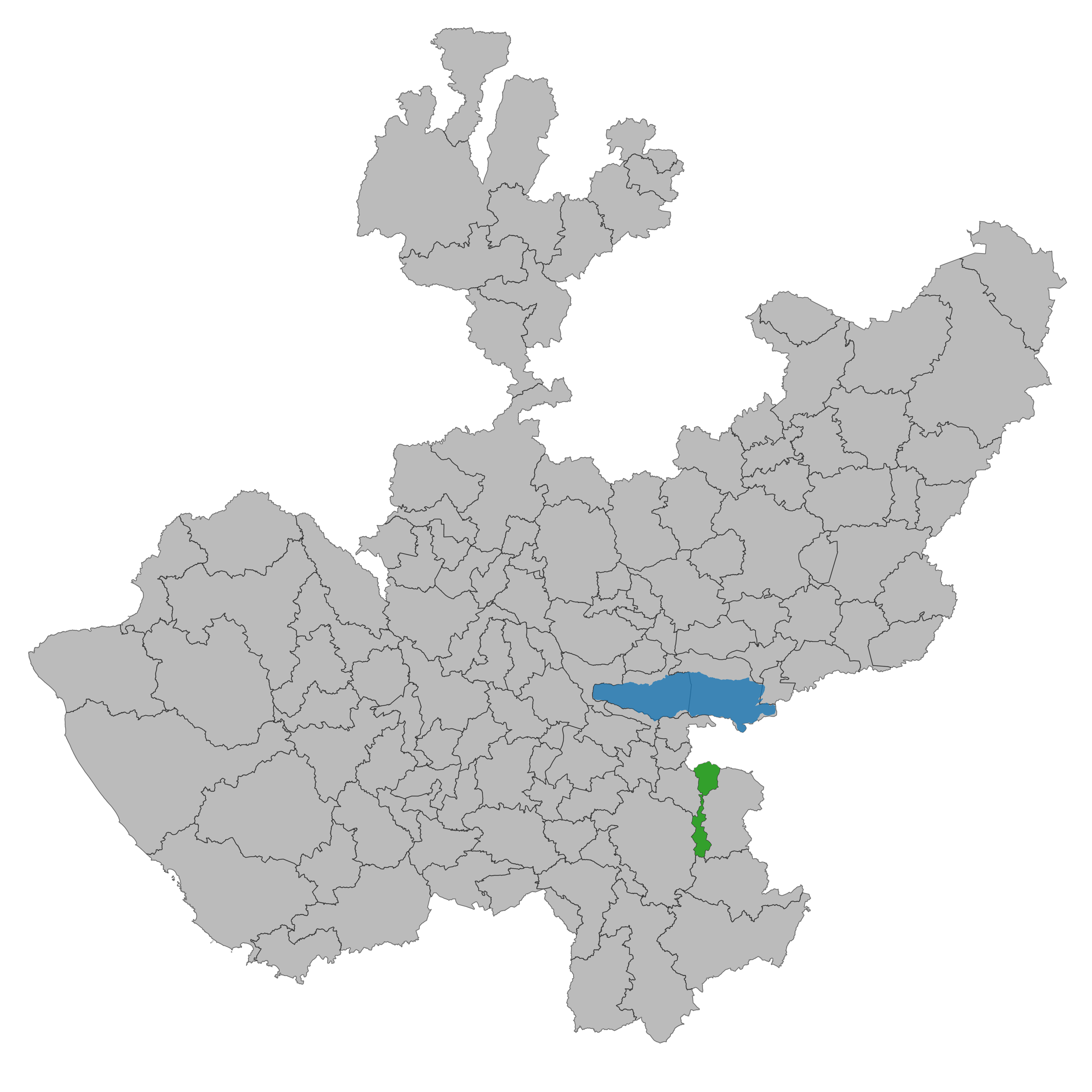
- Location of the municipality in Jalisco

- Location in Mexico
- Coordinates: 19°52′N 102°49′W
- Country: Mexico
- State: Jalisco

Government

Area
  - Total: 195.2 km^{2} (75.4 sq mi)
  - Town: 2.32 km^{2} (0.90 sq mi)

Population (2020 census)
  - Total: 6,151
  - Town: 4,418
  - Town density: 1,900/km^{2} (4,930/sq mi)
- Time zone: UTC-6 (Central Standard Time)

Valle de Juárez is a town and municipality, in Jalisco in central-western Mexico. The municipality covers an area of 195.2 km^{2}.

In 2005, the municipality had a total population of 5,218.
