= Concepción de Buenos Aires =

Concepción de Buenos Aires Pueblo Nuevo
- Municipality and town
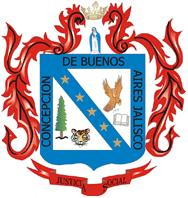
- Coat of arms

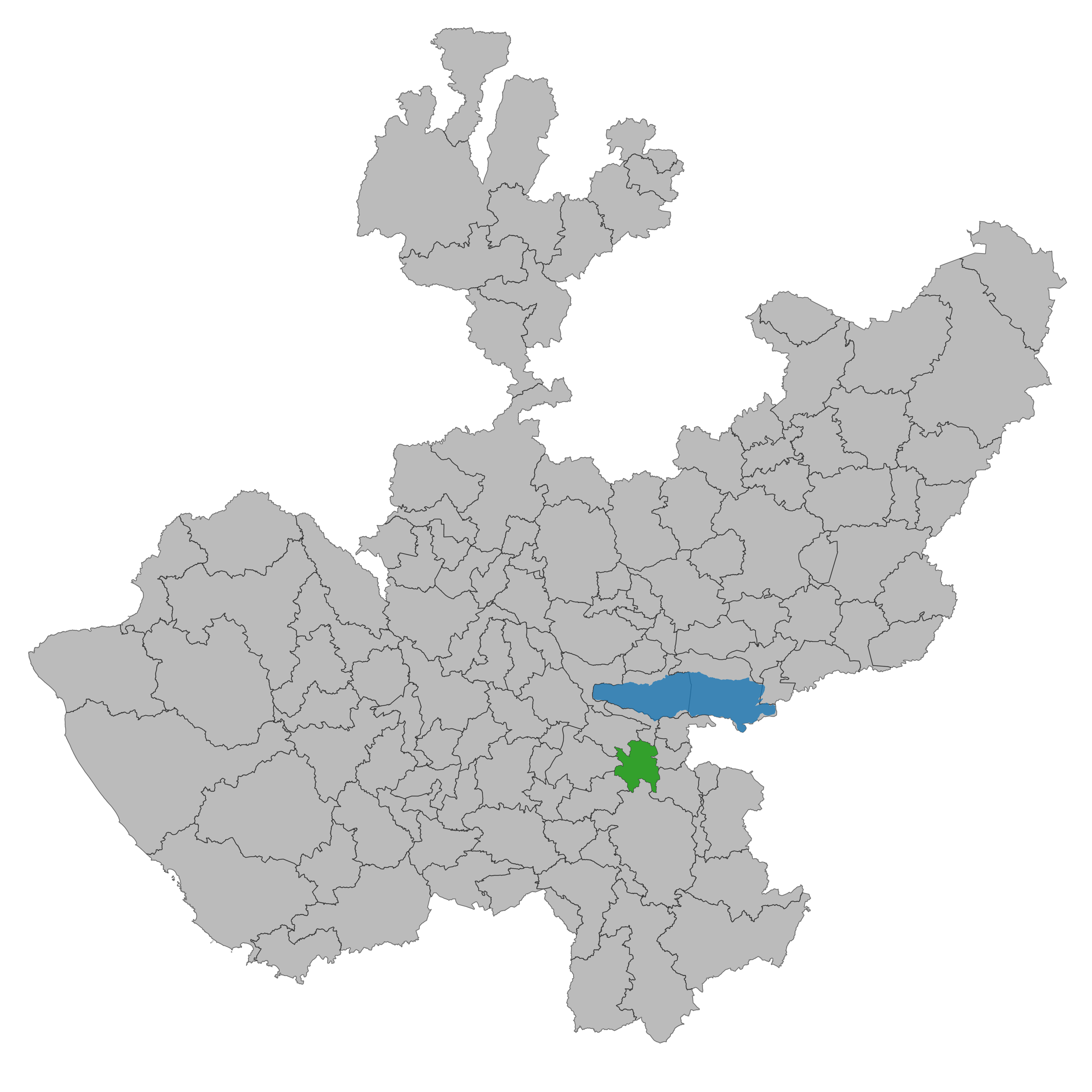
- Location of the municipality in Jalisco

- Location in Mexico
- Coordinates: 19°52′N 103°09′W
- Country: Mexico
- State: Jalisco

Government
  - Type: PES
  - Presidente: Cesar Navarro

Area
  - Total: 265.6 km^{2} (102.5 sq mi)
  - Town: 2.1 km^{2} (0.81 sq mi)
- Elevation: 2,100 m (6,900 ft)

Population (2020 census)
  - Total: 6,334
  - Density: 23.85/km^{2} (61.77/sq mi)
  - Town: 5,113
  - Town density: 2,400/km^{2} (6,300/sq mi)

Concepción de Buenos Aires is a town and municipality, in Jalisco in central-western Mexico. The municipality covers an area of 265.6 km^{2}.

As of 2020, the municipality had a total population of 6,334.

Rafael Urzúa was municipal president from 1968–1970

== Climate ==
Climate data for Concepción de Buenos Aires (1991–2020 normals, extremes 1973–present)
Month	Jan	Feb	Mar	Apr	May	Jun	Jul	Aug	Sep	Oct	Nov	Dec	Year
Record high °C (°F)	30.5 (86.9)	31 (88)	33 (91)	35 (95)	34 (93)	41 (106)	32.5 (90.5)	33 (91)	35.5 (95.9)	33.5 (92.3)	32 (90)	33.5 (92.3)	41 (106)
Mean daily maximum °C (°F)	21.8 (71.2)	23.7 (74.7)	25.5 (77.9)	27.5 (81.5)	27.7 (81.9)	25.1 (77.2)	22.7 (72.9)	22.8 (73.0)	22.5 (72.5)	22.6 (72.7)	22.3 (72.1)	21.9 (71.4)	23.8 (74.8)
Daily mean °C (°F)	13.6 (56.5)	14.8 (58.6)	16.2 (61.2)	18.0 (64.4)	19.0 (66.2)	18.7 (65.7)	17.3 (63.1)	17.3 (63.1)	17.1 (62.8)	16.3 (61.3)	14.9 (58.8)	13.9 (57.0)	16.4 (61.5)
Mean daily minimum °C (°F)	5.5 (41.9)	5.8 (42.4)	7.0 (44.6)	8.5 (47.3)	10.4 (50.7)	12.3 (54.1)	11.9 (53.4)	11.8 (53.2)	11.7 (53.1)	9.9 (49.8)	7.5 (45.5)	6.0 (42.8)	9.0 (48.2)
Record low °C (°F)	0 (32)	0 (32)	0 (32)	2 (36)	2 (36)	6 (43)	8 (46)	4.5 (40.1)	5 (41)	3.5 (38.3)	0 (32)	1 (34)	0 (32)
Average precipitation mm (inches)	33.5 (1.32)	20.1 (0.79)	12.2 (0.48)	12.1 (0.48)	53.8 (2.12)	149.3 (5.88)	223.8 (8.81)	202.4 (7.97)	197.0 (7.76)	102.9 (4.05)	29.2 (1.15)	9.2 (0.36)	1,045.5 (41.16)
Average precipitation days	3.6	1.9	1.3	1.9	5.6	15.9	22.5	20.9	19.6	10.4	3.4	1.6	108.6
Source: Servicio Meteorológico Nacional
