= Tuxcueca =

- Municipality and town
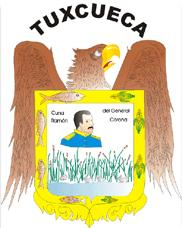
- Coat of arms

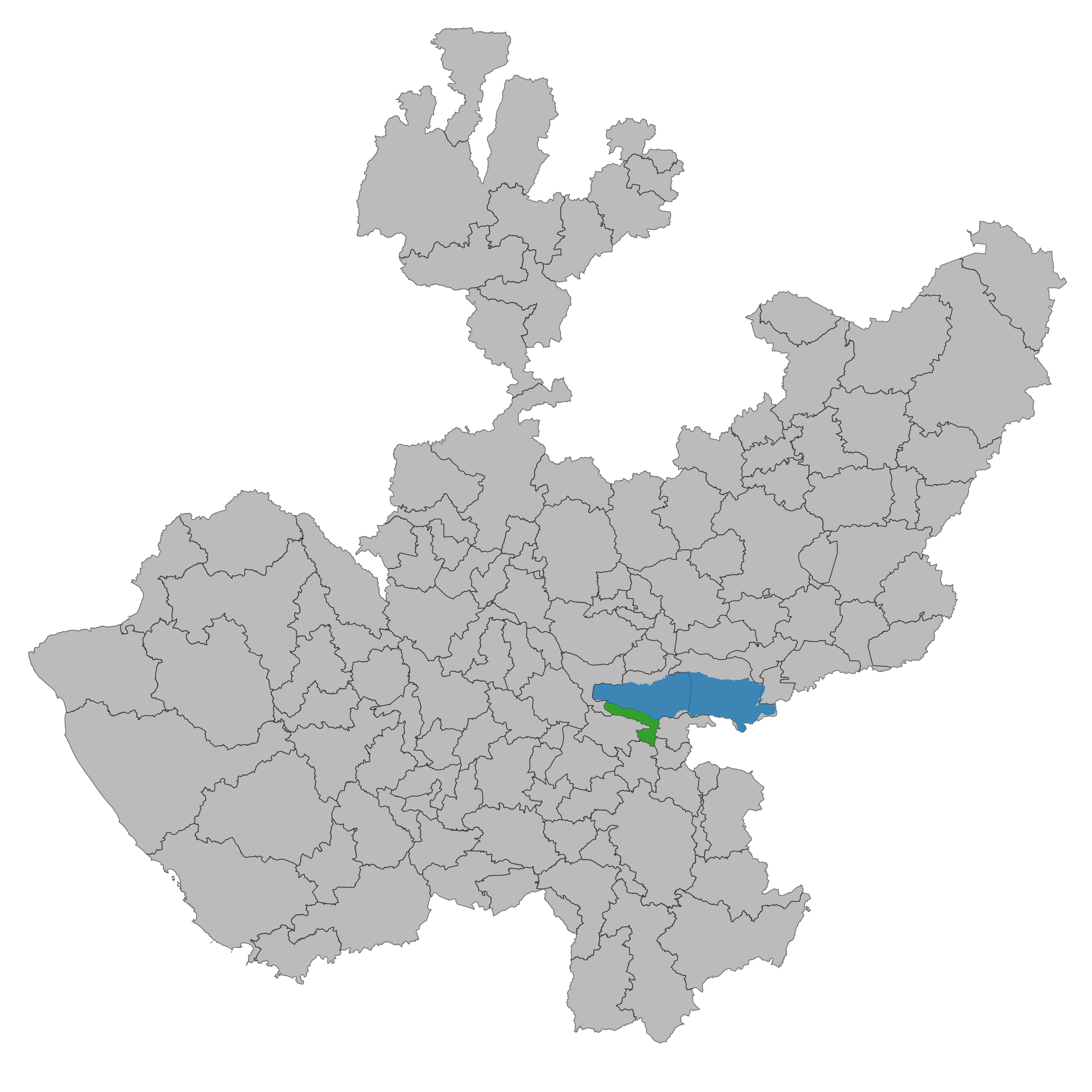
- Location of the municipality in Jalisco

- Location in Mexico
- Coordinates: 20°09′15″N 103°11′05″W
- Country: Mexico
- State: Jalisco

Government

Area
  - Total: 132.4 km^{2} (51.1 sq mi)
  - Village: 0.65 km^{2} (0.25 sq mi)

Population (2020 census)
  - Total: 6,702
  - Density: 50.62/km^{2} (131.1/sq mi)
  - Village: 1,424
  - Village density: 2,200/km^{2} (5,700/sq mi)
- Time zone: UTC-6 (Central Standard Time)

Tuxcueca is a town and municipality, in Jalisco in central-western Mexico. The municipality covers an area of 132.4 km^{2}.

As of 2018, the municipality had a total population of 5,765. The largest town of the municipality, San Luis Soyatlán, and the town of Tuxcueca are both located on the south shore of El Lago de Chapala.

== Climate ==
Climate data for Tuxcueca (1991–2020 normals, extremes 1946–present)
Month	Jan	Feb	Mar	Apr	May	Jun	Jul	Aug	Sep	Oct	Nov	Dec	Year
Record high °C (°F)	29 (84)	31 (88)	34 (93)	41 (106)	38.5 (101.3)	37 (99)	40 (104)	38 (100)	37 (99)	33 (91)	40 (104)	33 (91)	41 (106)
Mean daily maximum °C (°F)	21.7 (71.1)	24.7 (76.5)	28.1 (82.6)	30.6 (87.1)	31.8 (89.2)	30.1 (86.2)	27.7 (81.9)	27.2 (81.0)	26.4 (79.5)	25.8 (78.4)	24.0 (75.2)	22.1 (71.8)	26.7 (80.1)
Daily mean °C (°F)	15.7 (60.3)	17.9 (64.2)	20.5 (68.9)	22.8 (73.0)	24.5 (76.1)	24.0 (75.2)	22.5 (72.5)	22.1 (71.8)	21.6 (70.9)	20.6 (69.1)	18.2 (64.8)	16.2 (61.2)	20.6 (69.1)
Mean daily minimum °C (°F)	9.7 (49.5)	11.1 (52.0)	13.0 (55.4)	15.0 (59.0)	17.2 (63.0)	17.9 (64.2)	17.2 (63.0)	17.0 (62.6)	16.8 (62.2)	15.4 (59.7)	12.4 (54.3)	10.3 (50.5)	14.4 (57.9)
Record low °C (°F)	1 (34)	1 (34)	2 (36)	7 (45)	10 (50)	11.5 (52.7)	7 (45)	7 (45)	9 (48)	1 (34)	2 (36)	0 (32)	0 (32)
Average precipitation mm (inches)	17.4 (0.69)	13.4 (0.53)	6.3 (0.25)	4.0 (0.16)	29.3 (1.15)	142.8 (5.62)	145.3 (5.72)	136.2 (5.36)	141.5 (5.57)	53.7 (2.11)	21.2 (0.83)	7.3 (0.29)	718.4 (28.28)
Average precipitation days	2.5	1.6	1.0	0.7	3.1	13.4	16.5	15.5	14.9	7.1	2.5	1.4	80.2
Source: Servicio Meteorológico Nacional
