= San Martín de Hidalgo Municipality =

San Martín de Hidalgo Municipality Municipio de San Martín de Hidalgo
- Municipality
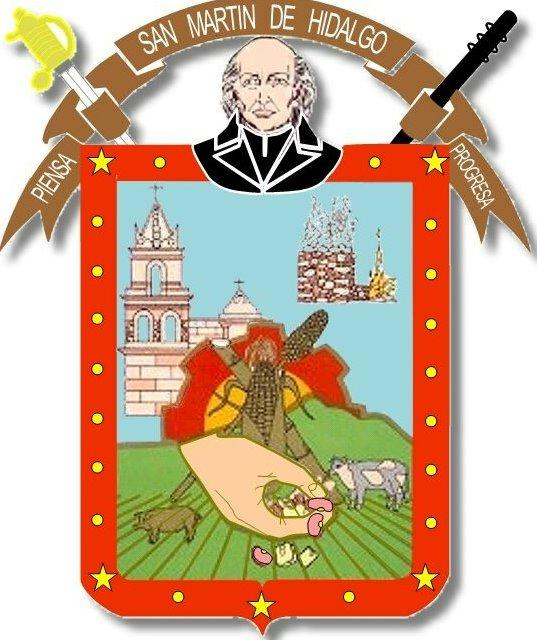
- Coat of arms
- Motto: Piensa, progresa
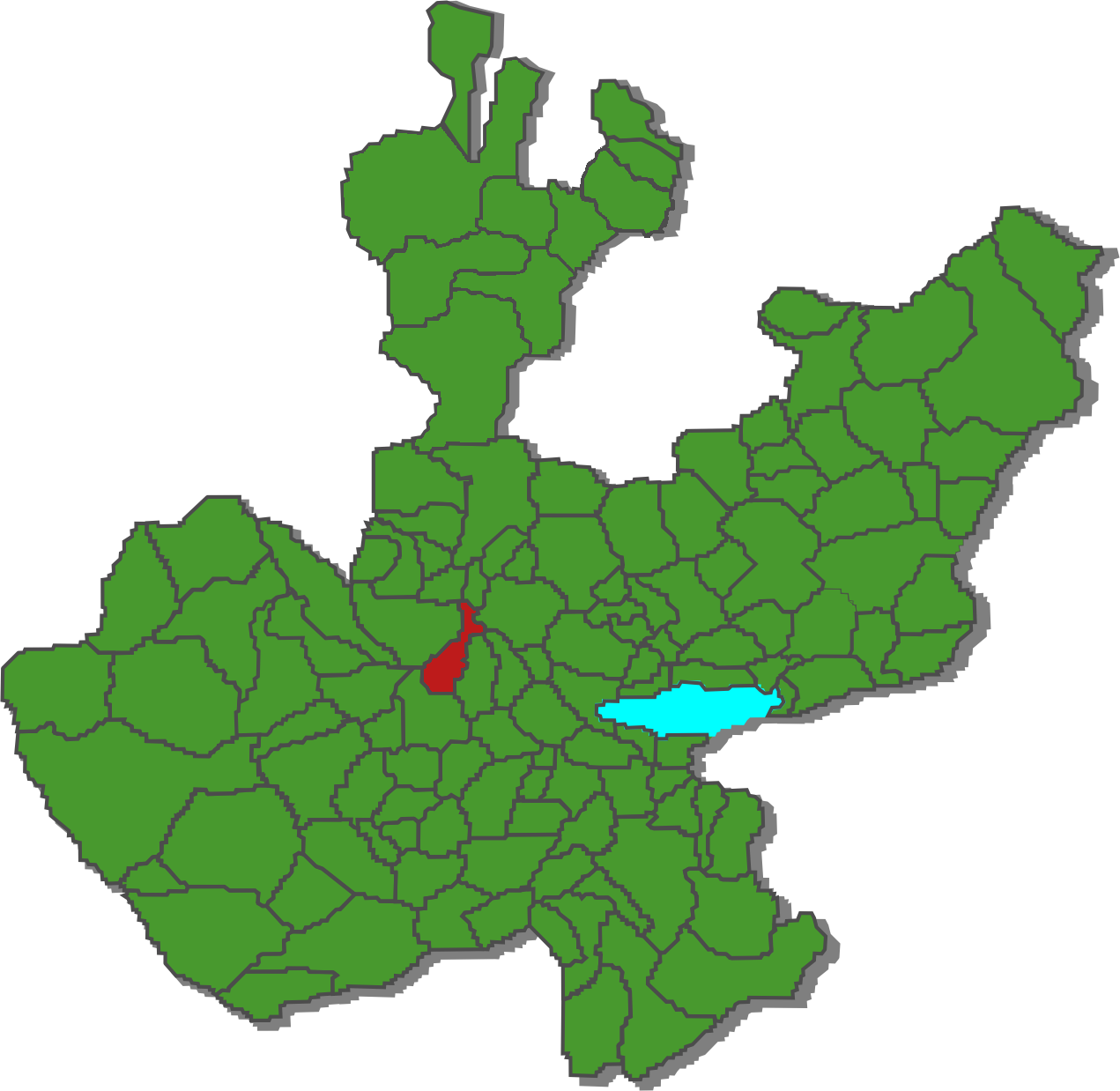
- Location of the municipality in Jalisco
- Coordinates: 20°26′06″N 103°55′43″W
- Country: Mexico
- State: Jalisco
- Region: Valles
- Established: 1813

Government
  - Municipal president: Juana Ceballos Guzmán (PVEM)

Area
  - Municipality: 344.16 km^{2} (132.88 sq mi)
  - Water: 5.39 km^{2} (2.08 sq mi)
  - Urban: 2.72 km^{2} (1.05 sq mi)
- Elevation: 1,305 m (4,281 ft)

Population (2020)
  - Municipality: 28,102
  - Density: 81.654/km^{2} (211.48/sq mi)
- Demonym: Sanmartínense
- Time zone: UTC-6 (Central Standard Time)
- Website: Official website

San Martín de Hidalgo Municipality (Spanish: Municipio de San Martín de Hidalgo) is a municipality located in the Región Valles of the state of Jalisco, Mexico. As of 2010, the population was 26,306. The municipal seat is San Martín de Hidalgo. Other administrative communities include 5 delegations and 18 agencies.

== History ==
The municipal council was established in 1823.

== Geography ==
The municipality is situated in the Valley of Ameca and the Sierra de Quila, of the Mexican state of Jalisco. In the 2010 census, its population totaled 24,127 inhabitants. The municipal seat is San Martín de Hidalgo, and its boroughs are El Crucero de Santa María, El Salitre, El Tepehuaje de Morelos, Buenavista de Cañedo, and Santa Cruz de las Flores. The municipality covers an area of 324.57 km². As of 2010, the municipality had a total population of 26,306.

Bordering the adjacent municipalities of Teuchitlán on the north, Ameca on the west, Tecolotlán on the south and Cocula on the east.

In territorial means, the municipality is divided into six regional subcommittees all chaired by the municipal seat, they are El Crucero de Santa María, El Salitre, El Tepehuaje de Morelos, Buenavista de Cañedo, and Santa Cruz de las Flores. Each of these Municipal Delegations serve as the regional seats for other smaller communities called Municipal Agencies.

== Communities and populations ==
Name	1900 census	2000 census	2005 census	2010 census	2020 census
San Martín de Hidalgo	3,243	7,464	7,001	8,092	8,850
El Crucero de Santa María	_	3,356	3,228	3,175	3,431
El Salitre	716	2,924	2,434	2,708	2,870
El Tepehuaje de Morelos	771	2,523	2,163	2,245	2,331
Buenavista de Cañedo	672	2,363	2,001	2,163	2,348
Santa Cruz de las Flores	698	1,931	1,397	1,531	1,367
Trapiche de Abra	157	1,235	1,115	1,280	1,379
Labor de Medina	295	882	863	863	910
Los Guerrero	238	801	674	724	741
Ipazoltic	676	531	510	533	566
San Jerónimo (Los Barbosa)	360	465	341	355	329
San Isidro Palo Verde	144	340	341	347	434
Jesús María (El Zapote)	468	301	278	319	340
Lázaro Cárdenas	_	296	235	297	276
Los Vergara	131	303	269	281	334
San Jacinto	349	298	227	269	290
Camajapita	406	_	280	238	228
Venustiano Carranza	_	_	93	199	154
Santa Rosa del Jilguero	84	_	47	161	194
Río Grande	_	_	234	141	240
San Jacintito (El Ranchito)	_	_	119	122	129
Lagunillas	236	_	94	106	82
Mesa del Cobre	209	_	54	44	44
El Cobre	101	_	36	36	51

== Government ==
=== Municipal presidents ===
Municipal president	Term	Political party	Notes
José Tovar	1828		
Antonio Zepeda	1857–1858		
Francisco Rodríguez	1861		
Aniceto Coracero	1861		
Trinidad Zepeda	1862		
Jesús Monroy	1862		
Trinidad Zepeda	1863		
Ramón García	1863		
José María Zepeda	1866		
Lucas Guerrero	1866		
Aniceto Coracero	1867		
Gabino Cedano	1867		
Ireneo Zepeda	1868		
Abad Meza	1868–1869		
Gabino Cedano	1870		
Vicente Camacho	1870		
Gabino Cedano	1871–1872		
Teófilo Zepeda	1872		
Gabino Cedano	1872–1873		
Catarino Beas	1874		
Vicente Camacho	1874		
Catarino Beas	1875		
Francisco Landázuri	1875		
Marcelino Guerrero	1876		
Tranquilino Núñez	1876		
Gabino Cedano	1877–1878		
Francisco Rosas	1878		
Eduwiges Beas	1878		
Francisco Rosas	1879		
Rodrigo Zepeda	1880–1881		
Felipe Vergara	1882–1883		
Juan Cedano	1884		
Felipe Vergara	1885		
Virgen Rosas	1885		
Juan Cedano	1887–1889		
Reyes Zepeda	1890		
Virgen Zepeda	1890		
José Rosas	1891		
Reyes Zepeda	1891		
Teófilo Zepeda	1891		
Raymundo Santos	1892		
Trinidad Zepeda	1893		
Juan Cedano	1894		
Domingo Buenrostro	1894		
Teófilo Zepeda	1895		
Felipe Vergara	1896		
Reyes Zepeda	1897		
Juan Cedano	1897		
Francisco López	1898		
Teófilo Zepeda	1898		
Reyes Zepeda	1899		
Domingo Buenrostro	1899–1900		
Reyes Zepeda	1901		
J. Trinidad B. Zepeda	1901		
Domingo Buenrostro	1902–1903		
Felipe Vergara	1904		
Francisco de la Peña	1904		
Benjamín Sevilla	1905		
Miguel Villamar	1905		
Eliseo Casanova	1906		
José Encarnación	1906–1907		
Francisco de la Peña	1907		
José Encarnación	1908–1909		
Epifanio Páez	1909–1910		
Luis Vizcaíno	1910		
J. Jesús García	1910		
Luis G. Vizcaíno	1911		
J. Jesús García	1911		
Alberto Ponce de León	1911		
Santos Arreola	1912		
José Encarnación	1912		
Francisco C. Horta	1912		
Porfirio Encarnación	1913		
Carlos Gómez Luna	1913		
Erasmo Águila	1914		
Valentín García	1914		
Rafael Beas	1914		
Erasmo Águila	1915		
Jacob Mandujano	1915		
Federico Rosas	1915		
José Isaac Pérez	1916		
Valentín García	1916		
David Guerrero	1917		
Ignacio R. Guerrero	1917		
Jesús S. Rosas	1918		
Estanislao Medina	1918		
Ignacio G. Zárate	1919		
Domingo Buenrostro	1919		
David Guerrero	1919		
Malaquías García	1920		
J. Guadalupe López	1920		
Melquiades Álvarez	1920		
Domingo Buenrostro	1921		
Alfonso G. Zárate	1921		
Leopoldo Zepeda	1921		
J. Guadalupe López	1922		
Alfonso G. Zárate	1922		
Alfonso Zepeda	1923		
Rafael Rodríguez	1924		
Rosalío González	1924		
Ramón B. Rivera	1924		
Pablo Rosas	1925		
Nemesio Medina	1925		
Rafael Rodríguez	1925		
J. Guadalupe López	1926		
Nemesio Medina	1927		
Estanislao Medina	1927		
Ignacio Z. Santos	1927		
Macario Aguilar	1928		
Antonio Pacheco	1928		
J. Trinidad López	1928		
Alfonso G. Cevallos	1929–1931		
José F. Guerrero	1931	PNR	
José Aristeo Medina	1932	PNR	
Francisco G. Camacho	1933	PNR	
Rafael B. Pérez	1934	PNR	
Salvador Virgen	1934	PNR	
Antonio Santos	1935	PNR	
Salvador Aceves	1935		President of the Municipal Council
Francisco Casas	1936	PNR	
Martín Zepeda	1936	PNR	
Ignacio G. Zárate	1936	PNR	
Claro Buenrostro	1937	PNR	
Ignacio Guerrero R.	1937	PNR	
Rafael Pérez	1938–1939	PNR	
Gabino Preciado	1938–1939	PRM	
Ramón Degollado	1940	PRM	
Candelario P. Hernández	1940	PRM	
Gabino Preciado	1941–1942	PRM	
J. Jesús González	1942	PRM	
José C. Guerrero	1943	PRM	
Rafael Zárate	1943	PRM	
José C. Guerrero	1944	PRM	
Manuel Rivas Morales	1945–1946	PRM	
Crisóforo Rosas	1947–1948	PRI	
Juventino G. Gómez	1949–1951	PRI	
Fidencio Rosas	1951–1952	PRI	
Justino López Rosas	1953–1955	PRI	
Rafael Zárate Andrade	1956–1957	PRI	
Juan José Pulido Zepeda	1957–1958	PRI	
Alfonso G. Zárate	1959–1960	PRI	
Alfonso Gutiérrez Zepeda	1961	PRI	Acting municipal president
José F. Guerrero	01-01-1962–31-12-1964	PRI	
Francisco Camacho López	01-01-1965–31-12-1967	PRI	
José Raymundo López Barbosa	01-01-1968–31-12-1970	PRI	
Exiquio Águila Jiménez	01-01-1971–31-12-1973	PRI	
José Ramírez Pérez	01-01-1974–31-12-1976	PRI	
José de Jesús Camacho Barreto	01-01-1977–31-12-1979	PRI	
Joaquín Morales Abreu	01-01-1980–31-12-1982	PRI	
Ramón Guerrero Ríos	1983–1985	PRI	
Andrés Alonso Zárate Guerrero	1986–1988	PRI	
Delfino Rodríguez Bernal	1989–1992	PRI	
Casimiro Zárate Guerrero	1992–1995	PRI	
Carlos Alberto Rosas Camacho	1995–1997	PRD	
María Guadalupe Urzúa Flores	01-01-1998–31-12-2000	PRI	
Carlos Alberto Rosas Camacho	01-01-2001–31-12-2003	PAN	
Vicente Aceves Santos	01-01-2004–31-12-2006	PAN	
Carlos Alberto Rosas Camacho	01-01-2007–31-12-2009	PRD; PT	
Francisco Javier Guerrero Núñez	01-01-2010–30-09-2012	PRI; Panal	Coalition "Alliance for Jalisco"
Juana Ceballos Guzmán	01-10-2012–30-09-2015	PRI; PVEM	Coalition "Compromise for Jalisco"
Carlos Alberto Rosas Camacho	01-10-2015–30-09-2018	MC	
Moisés Rodríguez Camacho	01-10-2018–04-03-2021	PAN; PRD; MC	Applied for a leave to run for reelection, which he got
Clemente Gómez Hernández	05-03-2021–15-08-2021	PAN; PRD; MC	Acting municipal president
Moisés Rodríguez Camacho	16-08-2021–30-09-2021	PAN; PRD; MC	Resumed, to finish his triennium
Moisés Rodríguez Camacho	01-10-2021–30-09-2024	MC	He was reelected on 6 june 2021
Juana Ceballos Guzmán	01-10-2024–	PVEM	

|}
