= Las Minas Creek =

Coordinates: 22°21′N 102°25′W

Location
- Country: Mexico
- State: Jalisco
- Cities: San Jerónimo, Jalisco, Santa Cruz de las Flores, Jalisco

Physical characteristics
- Source
  - location: Las Minas, San Martín de Hidalgo, Región Valles, Jalisco, Mexico
- Length: 6 mi (9.7 km)

Las Minas Creek is one of the main tributaries of the San Martín River in southwestern San Martín de Hidalgo municipality in the Mexican state of Jalisco.

The stream originates from its source near the town of Quila el Grande, then flows northeastward toward the community of San Jerónimo where it forms a reservoir against the San Jerónimo Dam. In San Jerónimo, Las Minas adds up with other tributaries such as the Calera, Cañada, Ceboruco, and Blanco streams whose water sources come from aquifers of the Mesa de Ramos. From San Jerónimo, the stream flows to the east where it converges with the Río Grande to join the San Martín River at Santa Cruz de las Flores.
