= San Martín River (Mexico) =

- Native name: Río San Martín (Spanish)

Location
- Country: Mexico
- State: Jalisco
- Cities: Santa Cruz de las Flores, San Martín de Hidalgo, Los Vergara, Labor de Medina, El Cabezón

Physical characteristics
- Source: Sierra de Quila, Mesa de Ramos
  - location: San Martín de Hidalgo, Región Valles, Jalisco, Mexico
- Length: 10 mi (16 km)

Basin features
- Tributaries
  - left: Arroyo Las Minas
  - right: Arroyo de Río Grande

The San Martín River is a tributary of the main stem Ameca River, which drains into the Bahía de Banderas of the Pacific Ocean, near Puerto Vallarta, Jalisco. The river derives its name from the city of San Martín de Hidalgo, the largest town it flows through. It is fed from various smaller tributaries which rise from the Mesa de Ramos in the west and the Sierra de Quila in the south.

== See also ==
- Arroyo Las Minas, one of its main tributaries.
