= Haciendas in the Valley of Ameca =

Estates awarded to Spanish soldiers

The haciendas in the Valley of Ameca comprise a series of expansive land estates awarded to Spanish soldiers for their services in the military during the conquest of New Spain in the late 1500s. Although a great portion of these estates were built during the colonial period (1701–1821), some of them were inclusively built during the Porfirian period (1876–1910). These haciendas served as religious centers in their respective vicinities, most included capilla, or chapel, with its campanario.

These land estates were dedicated to farm labor, most in the production of mezcal, a wine made from agave plant. Other crops grown were sugar cane and rice; and livestock was also an important profit.

All located in central Jalisco, Mexico; many of the haciendas have grown into communities and are now partly damaged, in ruins, or have been remodeled.

A total of 21 haciendas settled in the Valley of Ameca helped the local flourishment. 13 of these haciendas belong to the Ameca, 3 to San Martín de Hidalgo, 2 to Cocula, and 3 to Tala.

== Haciendas ==
=== in alphabetical order ===
- Hacienda Buenavista de Cañedo
- Hacienda Cofradía de la Luz
- Hacienda Cuisillos
- Hacienda El Cabezón founded in 1578
- Hacienda El Cuis
- Hacienda El Portezuelo
- Hacienda Labor de Medina
- Hacienda Labor de Solís
- Hacienda La Esperanza founded in 1710
- Hacienda La Higuera
- Hacienda La Sauceda
- Hacienda La Villita
- Hacienda San Antonio Matute founded in 1749
- Hacienda San Ignacio
- Hacienda Jayamitla
- Hacienda San Juan de los Arcos
- Hacienda San José del Refugio
- Hacienda San José de Miravalle founded in 1870
- Hacienda San Miguel
- Hacienda San Nicolás
- Hacienda Santa María de la Huerta founded in 1573
