= Santa Cruz de las Flores, San Martín de Hidalgo, Jalisco =

Santa Cruz de las Flores Cuauhtémoc
- Town
- Location within Jalisco
- Coordinates: 20°23′30″N 103°57′03″W
- Country: Mexico
- State: Jalisco
- Municipality: San Martín de Hidalgo
- Territorial Sub-committee: Santa Cruz de las Flores
- Founded: c. 1540

Government
  - Type: Municipal Delegation
  - Municipal Delegate: Alfredo Núñez Figueroa
  - Sub-delegate: José Luis Espinoza Díaz
- Elevation: 1,372 m (4,501 ft)

Population (2020)
  - Total: 1,367
- Time zone: UTC-6 (Central Standard Time)
  - Summer (DST): UTC-5 (Central Daylight Time)
- Website: santacruzdlf.yolasite.com

Santa Cruz de las Flores (Nahuatl languages: Cuauhtémoc "descending eagle") is a town in the municipality of San Martín de Hidalgo in the Mexican state of Jalisco. It is the oldest town in the municipality, sources say it was one of the stopping points of the Aztec tribe before settling in Tenochtitlan, having been revealed the eagle emblem on the hillside area. The population was 1,367 according to the 2020 census.

The town is most famous for its parroquia, which dates to the mid-16th century. The town serves as the medical, cultural, and federal center for the towns surrounding it. The nearby towns within the territorial sub-committee of Santa Cruz are Jesús María, Río Grande, San Jerónimo, Mesa del Cobre, El Cobre, and Lagunillas.

Santa Cruz is strategically situated on an oblong hill about a half-mile south of the municipal seat. The town is known for its streets, that runs from west to east following a sloping terrain, which fits perfectly for the panoramic view of the inset valley of Santa Cruz.

== Population ==
According to the INEGI census of 2010; 1,531 inhabitants reside in Santa Cruz de las Flores. 756 of them male, and 775 of them female. There were a total of 432 homes in the locality. This figure decreased to 1,367 inhabitants in the 2020 census.
