= Ojo de Agua Dam (Mexico) =

Dam located in Jalisco, Mexico

Coordinates: 20°25′14″N 103°53′59″W

Ojo de Agua Dam (Spanish: Presa Ojo de Agua) is a dam that is located southeast of the town of El Tepehuaje de Morelos, Jalisco, Mexico. It is the apparently largest dam in the municipality of San Martín de Hidalgo.
