= Ameca =

Ameca may refer to:

== Biology ==
- Ameca (fish), a monotypic ray-finned fish genus in the family Goodeidae, with the only species Ameca splendens

== Places in Mexico ==
- Ameca, Jalisco, a city and municipality in central Jalisco
- Chiefdom of Ameca, a pre-Columbian state in Jalisco
- Ameca Valley, a large expansive plateau in Jalisco
- Ameca River
- Amecameca, in the State of México, often informally abbreviated to "Ameca"

== Humanoid Robot ==
- Ameca (robot)
