= Ameca Valley =

- Iquajocho, Valle de Ameca
- Floor elevation: 4,178 ft (1,273 m)
- Length: 30 m (98 ft)
- Width: 15 m (49 ft)
- Area: 264 mi^{2} (680 km^{2})

Geography
- Location: Jalisco, Mexico
- Population centers: Ameca, San Martín de Hidalgo, Cocula
- Borders on: Sierra de Ameca (north), Sierra de Quila (south)

The Ameca Valley (Nahuatl languages: Iquajocho, Spanish: Valle de Ameca), also known as the Ameca-Cocula Valley, is a valley and drainage basin situated in central Jalisco, Mexico. It is surrounded by mountain ranges of the Sierra Madre Occidental. The three main cities and municipalities of the valley are Ameca, San Martín de Hidalgo, and Cocula. The Ameca River and its smaller tributaries, such as the San Martín River, drain into the valley thus creating the Ameca drainage basin. The valley is part of the federal sub-division Región Valles, for which the city of Ameca serves as its seat.

== History ==
During the early 14th century, the valley was discovered by various Nahua peoples, who established the ancient chiefdoms of Amecatl and Cocollán there. After the arrival of the Spaniards, the valley was split into large land grants, farms, and grazing lands.
