= Malinxalchitl =

- Queen Regnant of Tzacualco
- Born: c. 1500; Kingdom of Tzacualco
- Died: c. 1524; Tzacualco, New Spain

Malinxalchitl, meaning "beautiful flower of evil" (died 1524) was the Nahua queen regnant of Tzacoalco during the time of the Conquest of the Aztec Empire.

When Francisco Cortés de San Buenaventura arrived at Tzacoalco in 1524, he could not dominate its inhabitants, which were later persuaded by the Franciscan friars. Since most of Tzacoalco's original inhabitants had fled to Sayula, the overlord Juan de Escárena ordered the foundation of present-day Zacoalco de Torres with Méxica and Otomí families along with twelve Spaniards set to protect Queen Malinxalchitl. However, she was later killed by an arrow that impacted her heart, the presumable "punishment" by the Amerindians for having shown alliance to the Spanish.

== See also ==
- Martín Huitzingarit, cacique of Huitzquilic who also surrendered himself peacefully to the Spanish.
