= Rancho la Mezcalera =

- Interactive map of Rancho la Mezcalera
- Coordinates: 20°24′46″N 103°57′50″W
- Country: Mexico
- State: Jalisco
- Elevation: 1,394 m (4,573 ft)
- Time zone: UTC-6 (Central Standard Time)
  - Summer (DST): UTC-5 (Central Daylight Time)

Rancho la Mezcalera is a rural inactive settlement 2 kilometers northeast of the town of San Jerónimo, Jalisco, Mexico. The means "the mezcal-pertained ranch" or "the Mezcalera Ranch".
