= Jesús María =

Jesús María may refer to:

== Argentina ==
- Jesús María, Córdoba

== Colombia ==
- Jesus María, Santander

== Cuba ==
- Jesús María, Havana, a ward of Old Havana

== Mexico ==
- Jesús María, Aguascalientes
- Jesús María, Nayarit
- Jesús María, Jalisco
- Jesús María (El Zapote), San Martín de Hidalgo, Jalisco
- Villa Jesús María, in Baja California
- Roman Catholic Territorial Prelature of Jesús María del Nayar

== Peru ==
- Jesús María District, Lima

== United States ==
- Jesus Maria, California, an unincorporated community
