= El Cerrito de los Tapia =

El Cerrito de los Tapia is a prominent populated hill of the town of San Jerónimo in the municipality of San Martín de Hidalgo, Jalisco, Mexico.

== History ==
The area was probably during the mid-19th century by the Tapia family. Gregorio Tapia (born 1860) the most prominent Tapia ancestor, lived in the area. He was married to Timtotea Barbosa, an affluent Barbosa whose father owned La Capilla and El Potrerito.

The name el Cerrito de los Tapia means "the hill of the Tapias", because of their majority in the area.

== The hill ==
El Cerrito de los Tapia is the highest hill in the town of San Jerónimo. It is 4993 ft above sea level. It is known for having the most panoramic view of the valley called Las Playas.

== Population ==
Although no official population count has been attributed exclusively to the area, La Capilla's population is composed of approximately 93 inhabitants.
