= Lázaro Cárdenas, Jalisco =

Lázaro Cárdenas
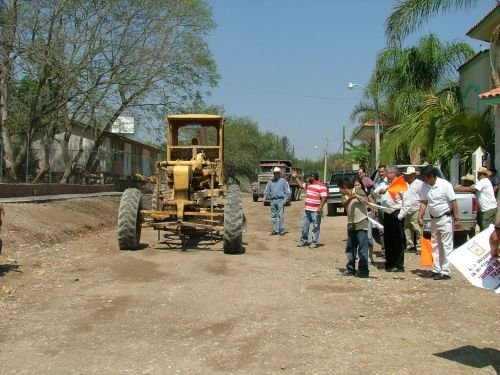
- The inauguration of Lázaro Cárdenas' highway.

- Seal
- Nickname: Cárdenas
- Interactive map of Lázaro Cárdenas
- Coordinates: 20°26′30″N 103°58′08″W
- Country: Mexico
- State: Jalisco
- Municipality: San Martín de Hidalgo
- Established: April 9, 1937

Government
  - Type: Municipal Agency
  - Municipal Agent: Illari Monserrat Moya Quintero
- Elevation: 1,325 m (4,348 ft)

Population (2020)
  - Total: 276
- Time zone: UTC-6 (Central Standard Time)
  - Summer (DST): UTC-5 (Central Daylight Time)

Lázaro Cárdenas (Spanish: [ˈlasaɾo ˈkaɾðenas]), also known as Cárdenas, is a town in the municipality of San Martín de Hidalgo in the Mexican state of Jalisco. The population was 276 according to the 2020 census.

== History ==
Prior to 1937, the area was known as Rancho 'El Camichín', a land grant owned by Jesús Rosas. The land was donated by Rosas with the purpose of constructing a townsite. Many of the people residing in the nearby town of San Jerónimo, migrated to acquire lands in the town. The town was officially established with a document signed on April 9, 1937 by the governor and residents dictating that the new name would be "Lázaro Cárdenas", in honor of Lázaro Cárdenas del Río, President of Mexico from Michoacán (1934–1940).

== Population ==
As of the INEGI census of 2005, there were 235 people residing in Lázaro Cárdenas. 115 of them being male, and 120 of them being female. The population was 297 according to the 2010 census.
