= Las Paredes, Jalisco =

Human settlement in Mexico

Las Paredes is a town in the municipality of San Martín de Hidalgo in the state of Jalisco, Mexico. Its Municipal Agent is Alfredo Moreno Maldonado and its Municipal Sub-agent Brenda Yessenia Medina Loreto, elected with 23 votes in favor.

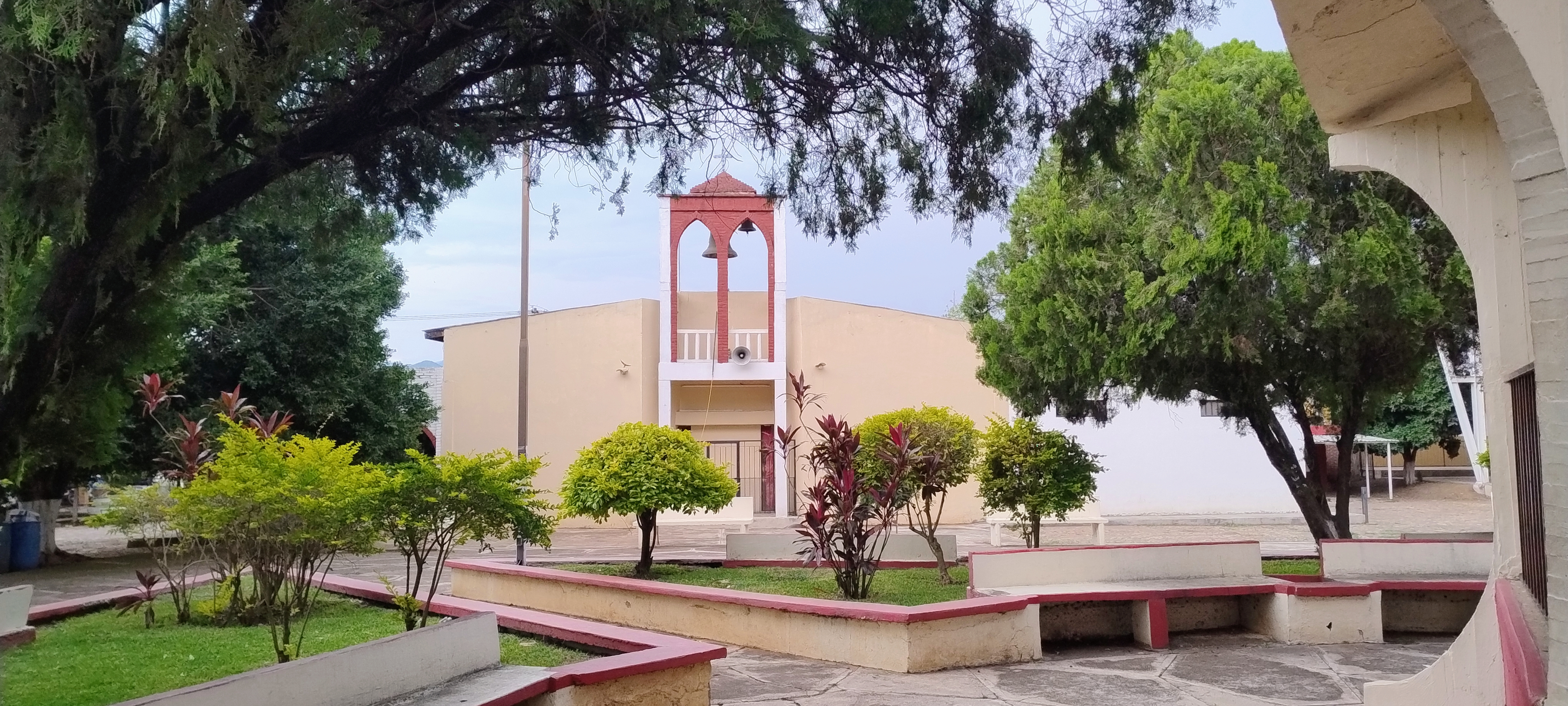
Church of las paredes
