= San Martín River =

San Martín River may refer to:

- San Martín River (Bolivia), a river in Beni Department
- San Martín River (Mexico), a river in Jalisco State
