= Planta de Beneficio =

- Interactive map of Planta de Beneficio
- Coordinates: 20°23′45″N 103°59′31″W
- Country: Mexico
- State: Jalisco
- Elevation: 1,455 m (4,774 ft)
- Time zone: UTC-6 (Central Standard Time)
  - Summer (DST): UTC-5 (Central Daylight Time)

Planta de Beneficio is a rural inactive settlement 1 kilometer southwest of the town of San Jerónimo, Jalisco, Mexico. The area is adjacent to the Presa San Jerónimo, probably where its name comes from, "plant of benefit".

The river valley approximately west of the area is usually called La Joya, or "the jewel". Although the INEGI census of 2010 recorded the settlement with 0 inhabitants, the area has two houses and one agave field.
