= Jesús María District =

Jesús María District may refer to:

- Jesús María District, Lima, Peru
- Jesús María District, San Mateo, in San Mateo (canton), Alajuela province, Costa Rica

== See also ==
- Jesús María (disambiguation)
