= La Barranca de San Jerónimo =

- La Barranca

Highest point
- Elevation: 6,044 ft (1,842 m)

Geography
- Location: Municipality of Ameca, Jalisco
- Parent range: Mesa de Ramos-San Jerónimo

Geology
- Mountain type: igneous extrusive

La Barranca de San Jerónimo, also known simply as La Barranca, is a cliff situated 1 mile northwest of the town of San Jerónimo, Jalisco, Mexico. Although the town adjacent to the cliff is located in the municipality of San Martín de Hidalgo, the Barranca lies within the neighboring municipality of Ameca.
