= Camajapita =

Town in Jalisco, Mexico

Coordinates: 20°21′N 103°55′W

Camajapita (English: Little Camajapa) is a town in the municipality of San Martín de Hidalgo in the state of Jalisco, Mexico. It has a population of 280 inhabitants. The town takes its name after the adjacent town of Camajapa, which lies on the municipality of Cocula, Jalisco.
