= Mesa del Cobre =

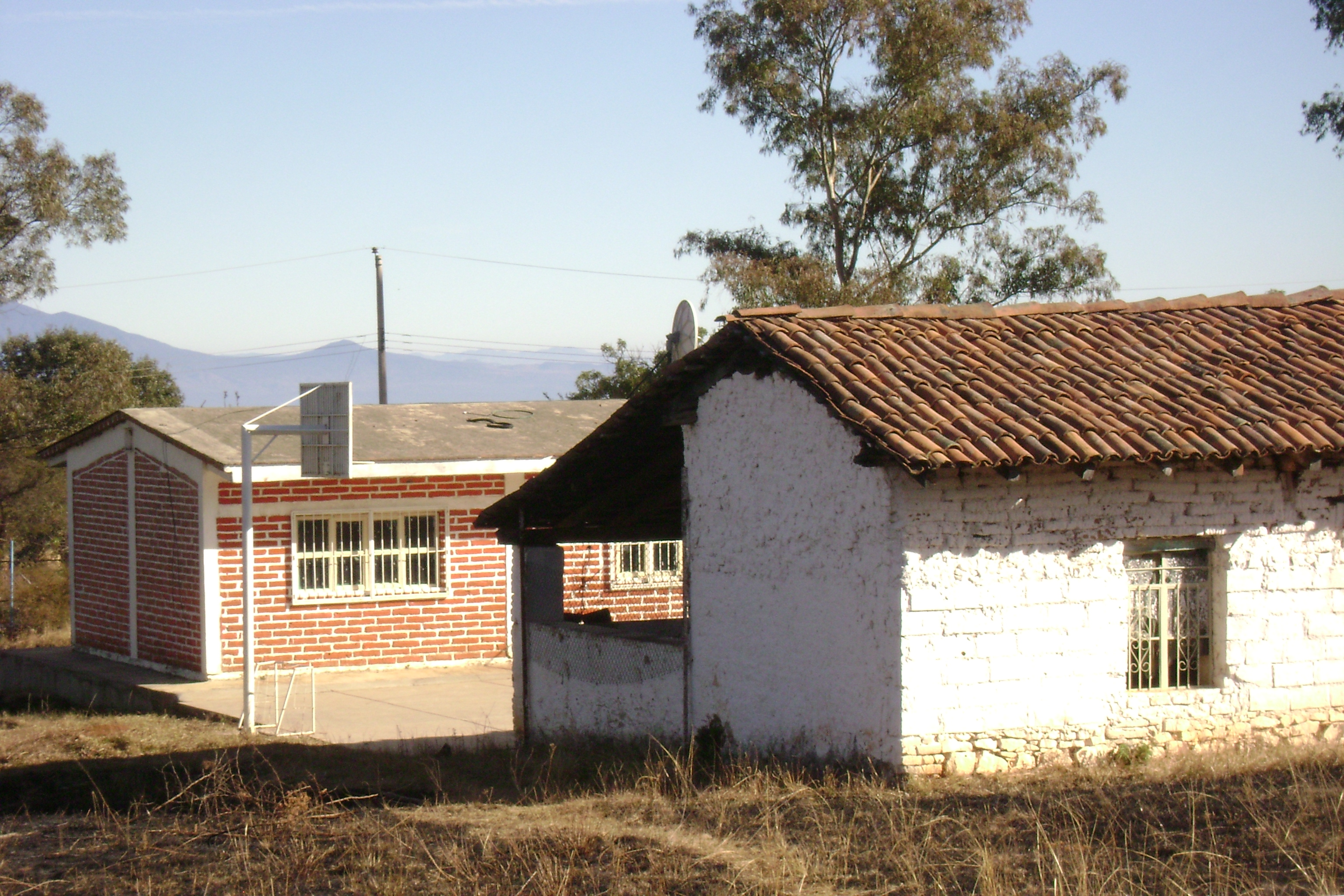
- The schoolhouse of Mesa del Cobre
- Interactive map of Mesa del Cobre
- Coordinates: 20°21′0″N 104°1′0″W
- Country: Mexico
- State: Jalisco
- Foundation: 1790

Government
  - Type: Municipal Agency
  - Municipal Agent: Ignacio Medina
  - Sub-agent: Gumecindo Calderon Calderon
- Elevation: 590 m (1,940 ft)

Population (2020)
  - Total: 44
  - Demonym: Meseño o cobreño
- Time zone: UTC-6 (Central Standard Time)
  - Summer (DST): UTC-5 (Central Daylight Time)

Mesa del Cobre is a town in the municipality of San Martín de Hidalgo in the Mexican state of Jalisco, approximately 2 hours southwest of Guadalajara. The population was 44 according to the 2020 census.

== Toponymics ==
The official name of Mesa del Cobre (meaning “The Copper Mesa” ) comes from its copper-orange colored soil. The town sits on top of a mesa, hence the name Mesa del Cobre. The nearest communities to Mesa del Cobre are El Cobre and Lagunillas, which reside 2 kilometers to the east. The population of Mesa del Cobre is about 50 as of 2005. The city was founded in 1890 by land settlers in nearby cities looking for farm land. The town used to be a forest until it was settled in 1890.

== Economy ==
Most of its economy depends on agriculture. 90% of it is the export of agave for the production of tequila, sábila and corn.

== Tourism ==
The Cerro El Huehuentón (8399 ft.) is the highest elevated point in the Sierra de Quila that surrounds the town and is visited by more than 500 people a year.
