= Santa Rosa del Jilguero =

Town in Jalisco, Mexico

Coordinates: 20.381°N 103.898°W

Santa Rosa del Jilguero is a town in the municipality of San Martín de Hidalgo in the state of Jalisco, Mexico. It has a population of 47 inhabitants.
