= Hacienda San José de Miravalle =

Hacienda San José de Miravalle Miravalle
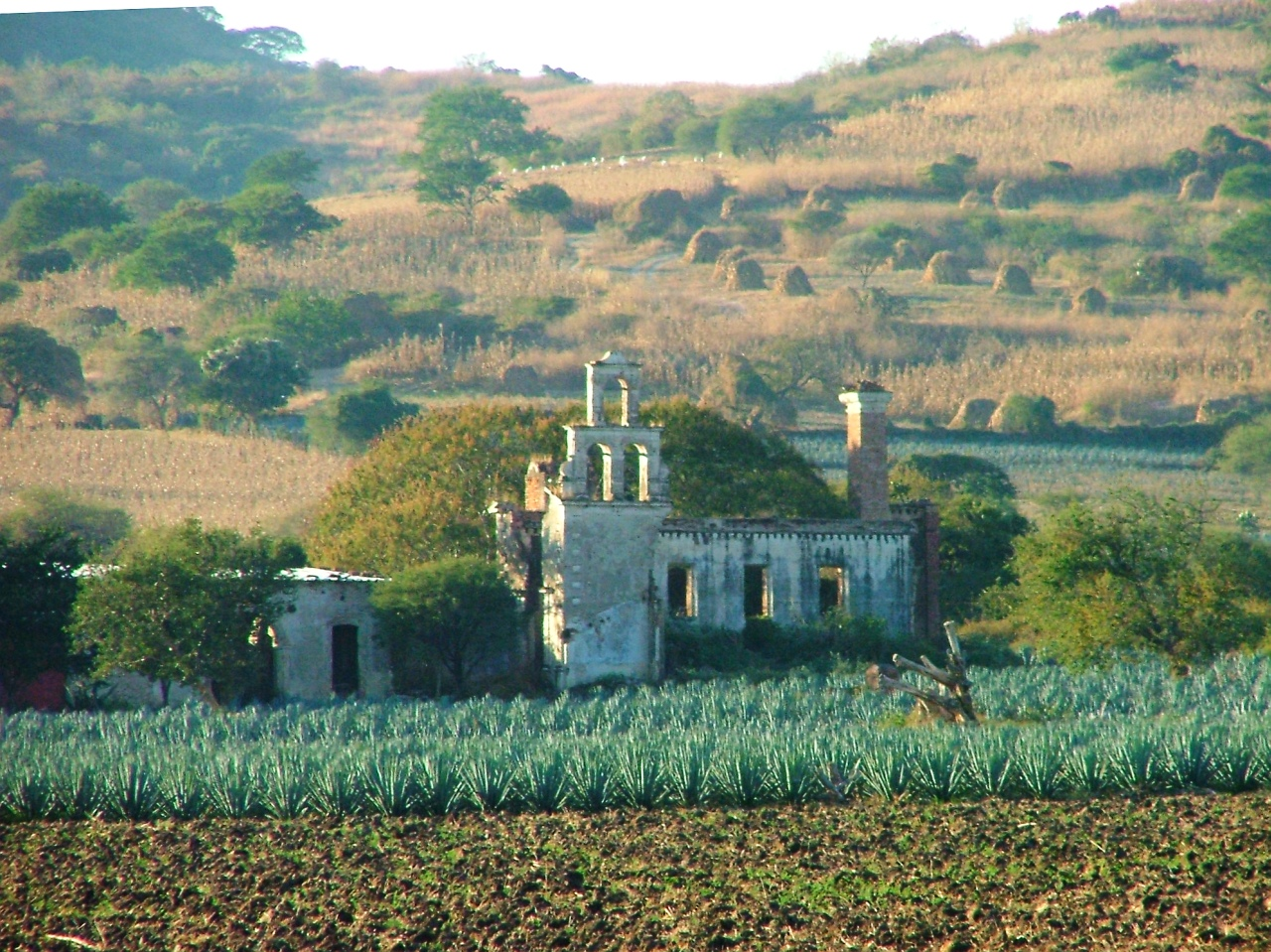
- The hacienda as it appeared in 2004.
- Interactive map of Hacienda San José de Miravalle
- Coordinates: 20°24′28″N 103°58′36″W
- Country: Mexico
- State: Jalisco
- Municipality: San Martín de Hidalgo
- Founded: 1870
- Elevation: 1,476 m (4,844 ft)
- Time zone: UTC-6 (Central Standard Time)
  - Summer (DST): UTC-5 (Central Daylight Time)
- Postal Code: 46770
- Website: sanjose.mx

Hacienda San José de Miravalle is a former mezcal-producing hacienda and currently a rural inactive community of the municipality of San Martín de Hidalgo in central Jalisco, Mexico. During the early twentieth-century, the hacienda was known for its productivity of mezcal business until the Mexican agrarian reform and other uprisings caused it dissolution.

== History ==
It was founded and settled in the valley of Ameca in 1870 by Don Felipe (born 1834), an aristocrat and leader of the municipality of San Martín de Hidalgo. The hacienda's location was also productive, due to the rich water springs in the western adjacent mountain to which an acequia would bring down water for the irrigation of the huerta containing the "arrayan", "mango", and "granada" trees.

The area to the west, a large mountain slope, was already settled and inhabited by the Barbosa family. They too had a chapels, barns, and lands.

In 1899, the hacienda was listed as a mezcal factory with Antonia Mijares de Arce as its owner. The hacienda was counted with 147 inhabitants in 1900, 73 were men and 74 were women.

By the early 1900s, the hacienda would grow into a community of 147 inhabitants primarily composed of peones, hacendados, and peasants. The residents of the nearby town of San Jerónimo would often visit the Chapel on Sundays, and would pass through the arcaded buildings, portales, which were lined with food stands serving pozole, enchiladas, menudo, and more regionally-typical cuisine.

Despite the fame the hacienda garnered (it transported mezcal to aristocrats of Guadalajara and Mexico City), the hacienda fell victim to the Mexican Revolution which left the Hacienda in ruins and with a mere small portion on which to sit on.

Today, the hacienda is officially still a community, although inactive. In the 1990s, a municipal plan, was brought into thought: that of relocating the population of San Jerónimo to the hacienda and repopulating and rebuilding the hacienda with a selected townsite.

== The family of the Hacienda San José de Miravalle ==
Don Felipe, the aristocrat and leader of San Martin County, was mayor for four terms alternating mandates with his only son-in-law, in acknowledgement for their entrepreneurial achievements and their popularity. He fathered one child, Maria Dolores, who convinced her father to start with the expansion of one of Don Felipe’s many production and commercial businesses: agave planting, which she later took over.

The artisanal Tequila of the Hacienda San Jose de Miravalle was produced in small quantities, and became known for its quality rather than for the amounts that were usually produced. The ‘Dones’ (Hacienda owners and rich gentlemen of the high society of Mexico between the 1600s and 1800s) indulged their guests with this exclusive elixir, as a special treat, only in the most special occasions. In that time, to transport the Tequila of Hacienda San Jose de Miravalle, wooden cars pulled by six or eight bulls would take almost four days to get to Guadalajara and fifteen full days to arrive to Mexico City in order to provide the ‘Dones’ with one of the best Tequilas Mexico has ever brought to life.

By the year 1907, Don Alfredo, the eldest of Dona Maria Dolores’ sons, took charge of the Hacienda San Jose de Miravalle, and under his leadership and hard work, the estate reached its shiniest times by providing for its more than 1,300 economic dependants that inhabited the valley. In the turbulent years that followed the Mexican Revolution (which with a very strong socialist hue claimed ‘land and freedom’ so land workers could own the land they worked on) an unimaginable number of Haciendas were expropriated by the ‘authorities’ throughout the country, among which Hacienda San Jose de Miravalle was counted, marking with it the abrupt end of all the productive activities that were held in the estate.

Almost 100 years later, in 2008, the restart has been marked by the family returns to its roots when glory days of Hacienda San Jose de Miravalle shined farther than what sight could reach from the top of the Hacienda’s chapel bell-tower.
