= Cerro El Huehuentón =

Mountain in Mexico

- El Huehuentón
- Location within Mexico

Highest point
- Elevation: 8,298 ft (2,529 m)
- Coordinates: 20°18′57.198″N 104°0′53.606″W

Geography
- Location: San Martín de Hidalgo / Tecolotlán, Jalisco
- Parent range: Sierra de Quila

The Cerro El Huehuentón (Nahuatl languages: Huēhuēntōn "little old man") is the highest peak of the Sierra de Quila; it stands at 8,298 ft above sea level. El Huehuentón is located at about a 30-minute drive from Lagunillas, the largest population enclaved in the forest, between the municipalities of San Martín de Hidalgo and Tecolotlán, in Jalisco.

It is not known why the mount got its peculiar name meaning "little old man", although the Tepenahuales, who spoke Nahuatl, inhabited the area since the 15th century.
