= San Jacinto, Jalisco =

Coordinates: 20.359°N 103.933°W

San Jacinto is a town in the municipality of San Martín de Hidalgo in the state of Jalisco, Mexico. It has a population of 227 inhabitants. It is located on the foothills of the Sierra Madre Oxidental mountain chain.
