= Mesa de Ramos =

- Nickname: La Mesa
- Interactive map of Mesa de Ramos
- Coordinates: 20°24′44″N 104°01′48″W
- Country: Mexico
- State: Jalisco
- Municipality: Ameca
- Founded: 1764
- Founder: Javier Ramos

Population (2010)
  - Total: 13

Mesa de Ramos is a rural community, municipal agency and ejido located in the southeastern portion of the municipality of Ameca, Jalisco, in Mexico. It has suffered depopulation, primarily because of the lack of resources and isolation. In 1900, the town was recorded as Mesa de los Ramos, and had 289 inhabitants. In the 2005 census there were only 40, and in 2010 there were 13.

The village was founded in 1764 when Javier Ramos, a resident of Ameca, bought a livestock site named "La Mesa" for 500 pesos from don José Ignacio de Villaseñor, the owner of Santa María.

The town sits on top of a mesa about 2,000 ft elevated from the Valley of Ameca. The only exit road that leads to the city of Ameca follows a very steep canyon, and is approximately 3 miles long until it reaches El Texcalame.

The area is settled on "la Mesa de Ramos", a semi-flat mountaintop that is surrounded by mountain slopes and foothills. Other towns settled in this mountainous-area are Altavista de Ramos to the north, Ipazoltic to the northeast, and San Jerónimo to the east.
