= San Isidro Palo Verde =

Coordinates: 20.391°N 103.910°W

San Isidro Palo Verde is a town in the municipality of San Martín de Hidalgo in the state of Jalisco, Mexico. It has a population of 341 inhabitants.
