= El Salitre =

El Salitre, Jalisco
- Town
- Location in Mexico
- Coordinates: 20.510°N 103.858°W
- Country: Mexico
- Municipality: San Martín de Hidalgo

Population
  - Total: 2,434
- Time zone: UTC-6 (Central Standard Time)
  - Summer (DST): UTC-5 (Central Daylight Time)

El Salitre is a town in the municipality of San Martín de Hidalgo in the state of Jalisco, Mexico. It has a population of 2,434 inhabitants.

== Climate ==
Climate is characterized by relatively high temperatures and evenly distributed precipitation throughout the year, leading to very warm nights. The Köppen Climate Classification subtype for this climate is "Cfa" (Humid Subtropical Climate).

Climate data for El Salitre
Month	Jan	Feb	Mar	Apr	May	Jun	Jul	Aug	Sep	Oct	Nov	Dec	Year
Mean daily maximum °C (°F)	28 (83)	30 (86)	32 (90)	34 (94)	35 (95)	33 (91)	29 (85)	30 (86)	30 (86)	31 (87)	29 (85)	28 (83)	31 (88)
Mean daily minimum °C (°F)	5 (41)	6 (42)	7 (45)	9 (49)	12 (54)	16 (60)	16 (61)	16 (61)	16 (61)	14 (57)	9 (48)	6 (43)	11 (52)
Average precipitation mm (inches)	18 (0.7)	7.6 (0.3)	0 (0)	2.5 (0.1)	23 (0.9)	180 (7.2)	240 (9.3)	180 (7)	150 (6.1)	41 (1.6)	13 (0.5)	13 (0.5)	870 (34.4)
Source: Weatherbase
