= Buenavista de Cañedo =

Buenavista
- Delegación Municipal
- Interactive map of Buenavista
- Coordinates: 20°33′55″N 103°51′08″W
- Country: Mexico
- State: Jalisco
- Municipality: San Martín de Hidalgo
- Territorial Sub-committee: Buenavista

Government
  - Type: Municipal Delegation
- Elevation: 1,250 m (4,100 ft)

Population (2010)
  - Total: 2,163
- According to the national INEGI census of 2010
- Time zone: UTC-6 (Central Standard Time)
  - Summer (DST): UTC-5 (Central Daylight Time)
- Postal code: 46775

Buenavista, is a town in the municipality of San Martín de Hidalgo in the state of Jalisco, Mexico. It has a population of 2,001 inhabitants.
