= María Guadalupe Urzúa Flores =

Mexican politician (1912–2004)

Federal deputy for Jalisco's 10th district
- In office 1955–1958

Federal deputy for Jalisco's 11th district
- In office 1964–1967

Federal deputy for Jalisco's 11th district
- In office 1970–1973

Federal deputy for Jalisco's 9th district
- In office 1976–1979

Municipal president of Jocotepec
- In office 1983–1985
- Preceded by: Salvador Huerta Chacón
- Succeeded by: Genaro Navarro Hoyos

Municipal president of San Martín de Hidalgo
- In office 1997–2000
- Preceded by: Carlos Alberto Rosas Camacho
- Succeeded by: Carlos Alberto Rosas Camacho

Personal details
- Born: December 12, 1912 Jocotepec, Jalisco, Mexico
- Died: December 7, 2004 (aged 91) Jocotepec, Jalisco, Mexico
- Party: Institutional Revolutionary Party
- Education: Pedro J. Vizcarra School of Commerce and Accounting

María Guadalupe Urzúa Flores (December 12, 1912 – December 7, 2004) was a Mexican politician and activist. She was elected to the Chamber of Deputies on four occasions and served as the municipal president of Jocotepec from 1983 to 1985 and as the municipal president of San Martín de Hidalgo from 1997 to 2000.

== Early life ==
Urzúa Flores was born in the town of Jocotepec, Jalisco, to José Urzúa Gutiérrez, a musician, and Rosario Flores Monroy, a schoolteacher from San Martín de Hidalgo. Her maternal grandfather Gerardo Flores was a physician who, at the request of Benito Juárez, settled in San Martín de Hidalgo. Maternally orphaned shortly after birth, Urzúa Flores was raised by her maternal aunts in San Martín de Hidalgo where she attended the Josefa Ortiz de Domínguez Primary School.

== Legacy ==
The localities of San Martín de Hidalgo and El Tepehuaje de Morelos have honored Urzúa Flores' memory by naming a street (G. Urzúa) and a public library (María Guadalupe Urzúa Flores Municipal Public Library) after her, respectively.

== See also ==
- 1970 Mexican general election
- 1982 Jalisco state election
- 1997 Jalisco state election
