= Jocotepec =

- Municipality and town
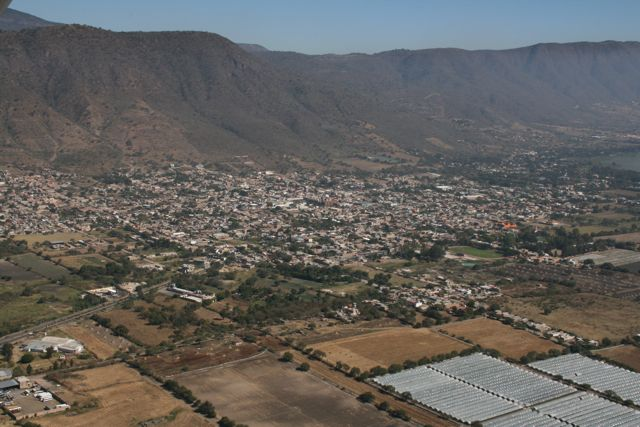

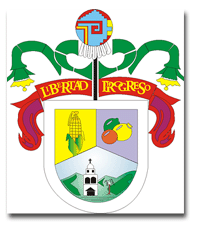
- Coat of arms

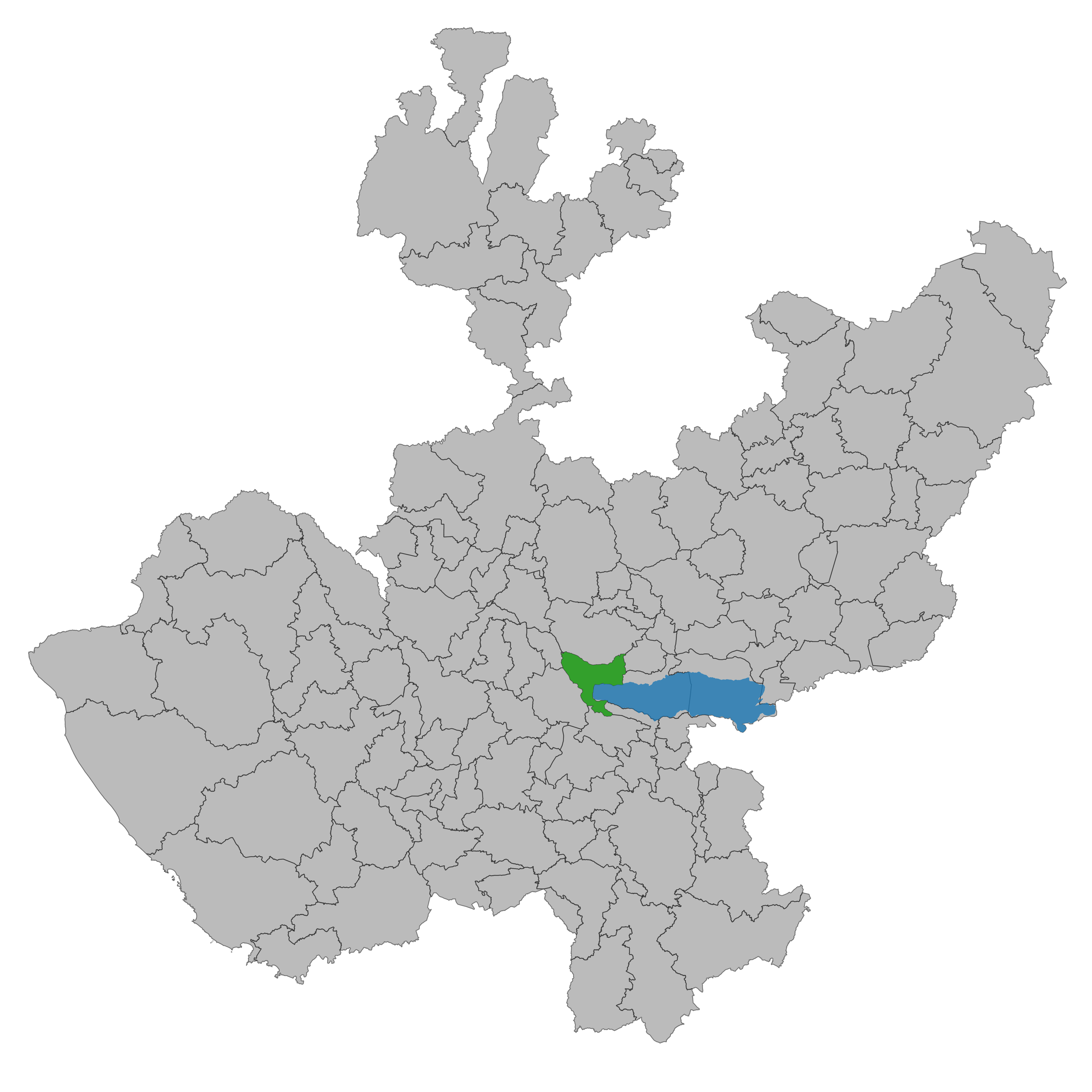
- Location of the municipality in Jalisco

- Location in Mexico
- Coordinates: 20°17′10.82472″N 103°25′49.404″W
- Country: Mexico
- State: Jalisco

Government
  - Type: Municipal
  - Municipal president: José Miguel Gómez López, Citizens' Movement

Area
  - Total: 324.3 km^{2} (125.2 sq mi)
  - Town: 5.61 km^{2} (2.17 sq mi)

Population (2020 census)
  - Total: 47,105
  - Density: 145.3/km^{2} (376.2/sq mi)
  - Town: 20,286
  - Town density: 3,620/km^{2} (9,370/sq mi)
- Time zone: UTC-6 (Central Standard Time)
- Website: jocotepec.jalisco.gob.mx

Jocotepec (Spanish pronunciation: [xokoteˈpek]) is a town and municipality, in Jalisco in central-western Mexico. The municipality covers an area of 324.3 km^{2}. As of 2005, the municipality had a total population of 37,972.

== History ==
Perhaps as early as 100 BC, nomadic bands of people passed through the Lake Chapala Valley. Some moved on, others settled on the shore. Jocotepec, once Xuxutepeque, a small fishing village at the western end of the Lake, became a permanent home for the Nahua people in 1361. They built a temple to their god, Iztlacateotl, and practiced human sacrifice. The village became a trading and ceremonial site for the surrounding mountain area.

"Xuxutepeque was the name given Jocotepec by its first Nahua settlers. (The last of the nomadic bands to settle in this area were the Purépecha.) It became a permanent home for the Nahuas in 1361. Xuxutepeque later became "Xilotepec", meaning "Hill of ear of Corn". Finally, with the arrival of the Spaniards, led by Jacob Tepec, the settlement's name became "Jocotepec" and was interpreted as meaning "Hill of Guavas". (Guavas are a small bitter-sweet tasting fruit.) The meaning of Jocotepec is thus derived: Xoco-tepe-K, meaning Xoco (fruit); Tepetl (hill); and K (place)."

In 1520, Captain Alonzo de Avalos was given this area as an encomienda (land grant). Chief Xitomatl, who then governed the area between Chapala and Jocotepec, submitted his territory to Spanish rule without a battle. In 1529, Jocotepec was formally founded, according to a title of property issued by Hernán Cortés, a copy of which can be found today in Jocotepec records.

Franciscan fathers then proceeded with conversion of the natives. Indigenous people's temples were destroyed and Catholic church foundations laid in their ruins. At that time, Jocotepec acquired its two religious protectors - Nuestro Señor del Monte and Nuestro Señor del Guaje.

The municipality of Jocotepec has a large variety of trees and plants, mostly located inside garden walls. The main plaza is surrounded by greenery, making it very inviting.

Vegetation is composed mainly of jacaranda, galeana, hule, pine, roble, cazuarina, mesquite, guamuchil, chaparrale, and encino. Fruit trees such as mango, avocado, lime, lemon and orange are also abundant.

In North Jocotepec, acacia, huizache and palo-bobos predominate, while in the south (lake) side, there are a few sauce trees and sabinos. Driscoll's grows strawberries, blackberries, and raspberries for export. Fields of corn and chayote are very common in this area.

Products of Jocotepec are mainly wool carpets in typical weaves and many colors, and the traditional serapes of this village. Another important industry is the fabrication of tiles, ready-made or made to the client's design. Wood and forged iron furniture can also be made to order. A large sweater factory is expected to soon start exporting. Recently, painting and music have been given a boost by local organizations promoting cultural events.

Jocotepec has two religious protectors: Nuestro Señor del Monte and Nuestro Señor del Guaje. A Fiesta Patronal (a religious celebration of these protectors) is held early in January. It lasts two weeks, and honors the first patron, the Lord of the Mountain, with daily masses, dances, cockfights, bullfights, parades and fireworks. Another fiesta, later in the year, honors Nuestro Señor del Guaje, but on a smaller scale.

The town has several sport recreation centers, two banks, and two gas stations.

== Government ==
=== Municipal presidents ===
Term	Municipal president	Political party	Notes
1932	Julián Ibarra	PNR	
1933	José María Aldrete	PNR	
1933	Vicente Urzúa Gutiérrez	PNR	
1934	Vicente Torres Olmedo	PNR	
1934	Ramón Castillo	PNR	
1935	Ignacio Aldana Cuevas	PNR	
1936	José Vergara Olmedo	PNR	
1937	??	PNR	
1938	??	PRM	
1939	Alberto Balcázar Chavoya	PRM	
1940	Antonio Ramírez Ochoa	PRM	
1941	Irineo Álvarez Bizarro	PRM	
1942	Alberto Balcázar Chavoya	PRM	
1943-1944	Porfirio Encarnación	PRM	
1945-1946	Cirilo Cuevas Ornelas	PRM	
1946	Porfirio Mena	PRI	
1947	José Olmedo Valencia	PRI	
1948	Francisco Jara Ramírez	PRI	
1949	Donaciano Olmedo Núñez	PRI	
1949-1952	Vicente Torres Olmedo	PRI	
1953-1954	Jesús Navarro Chacón	PRI	
1955	Catarino Olmedo Pérez	PRI	
01/01/1956-31/12/1958	Andrés Vergara Olmedo	PRI	
01/01/1959-31/12/1961	Mario González Barba	PRI	
01/01/1962-1963	Juan José Cuevas	PRI	
1963-31/12/1964	J. Jesús Rodríguez S.	PRI	
01/01/1965-31/12/1967	Alberto García Ibarra	PRI	
01/01/1968-31/12/1970	Arnulfo Vergara Ramírez	PRI	
01/01/1971-31/12/1973	Jorge Ibarra Gálvez	PRI	
01/01/1974-31/12/1976	José Reyes Prado	PRI	
01/01/1977-31/12/1979	Carlos Rodríguez Mendoza	PRI	
01/01/1980-31/12/1982	Salvador Huerta Chacón	PRI	
01/01/1983-31/12/1985	María Guadalupe Urzúa Flores	PRI	
01/01/1986-31/12/1988	Genaro Navarro Hoyos	PRI	
01/01/1989-1992	Miguel Ibarra Ramírez	PRI	
1992-1995	César Ramón López Jara	PRI	
1995-31/12/1997	Lorenzo Camarena Martínez	PAN	
01/01/1998-31/12/2000	José Olmedo Alonzo	PAN	
01/01/2001-31/12/2003	Miguel Cuevas Jara	PRI	
01/01/2004-31/12/2006	J. Jesús Palos Vaca	PVEM	
01/01/2007-31/12/2009	Felipe de Jesús Rangel Vargas	PAN	
01/01/2010-30/09/2012	Mario Guadalupe Chávez Morales	PAN	
01/10/2012-30/09/2015	John Francis O'Shea Cuevas	PRI; PVEM	Coalition "Compromise for Jalisco"
01/10/2015-30/09/2018	Héctor Manuel Haro Pérez	MC	
15/10/2018-14/12/2020	José Miguel Gómez López	PAN; PRD; MC	Coalition "For Jocotepec to the Front". He applied for a temporary leave, because of ill health, COVID-19
15/12/2020-2021	Juan José Ramírez Campos	PAN; PRD; MC	Coalition "For Jocotepec to the Front". Acting municipal president
01/10/2021-30/09/2024	José Miguel Gómez López	MC	He was reelected on 06/06/2021

== Notable people ==
- María Guadalupe Urzúa Flores (1912 – 2004), Municipal President of Jocotepec, from 1983 to 1985.
