= San Jacintito =

Human settlement in Mexico

Coordinates: 20.354°N 103.924°W

San Jacintito, also known as El Ranchito, is a town in the municipality of San Martín de Hidalgo in the state of Jalisco, Mexico. It has a population of 119 inhabitants.
