= Trapiche de Abra =

Town in Jalisco, Mexico

Coordinates: 20.539°N 103.820°W

Trapiche de Abra (English: The Mill of the Water gap) is a town in the municipality of San Martín de Hidalgo in the state of Jalisco, Mexico. It has a population of 1,115 inhabitants, 522 men, 592 women.
