= El Cobre, Jalisco =

El Cobre
- Interactive map of El Cobre
- Country: Mexico
- State: Jalisco
- Settled: c. 1890

Government
  - Type: Municipal Agency
- Elevation: 1,965 m (6,448 ft)

Population (2020)
  - Total: 51
- Time zone: UTC-6 (Central Standard Time)
  - Summer (DST): UTC-5 (Central Daylight Time)

El Cobre is a rural town in the municipality of San Martín de Hidalgo in the Mexican state of Jalisco. The town is in between the towns of Lagunillas and Mesa del Cobre, in Sierra de Quila, Jalisco's second-largest forest reserve. The population was 51 according to the 2020 census.

The town is topographically settled on top of a mesa with deposits of copper, hence its name of El Cobre, meaning "the copper".
