= Altavista de Ramos =

Coordinates: 20°26′N 104°01′W

Altavista de Ramos is a town in the municipality of Ameca, Jalisco. The town's first inhabitants were from Mesa de Ramos, a nearby community atop a mesa. The population was 327 according to the 2020 census.

Altavista is a planned community, having organized streets and plots. The community serves as a municipal agency for the Ameca municipality.

The prime families of Altavista include the Quirarte, Rea and the Ramos. Altavista is Spanish for "high-view", mainly because the town is located on the foothills of a mountain.
