= Jesús María, Santander =

Coordinates: 5°53′N 73°47′W

- Flag

- Location of the municipality and town of Jesús María, Santander in the Santander Department of Colombia.
- Country: Colombia
- Department: Santander Department
- Founded: August 12, 1887
- Founder: Lorenzo de Salazar

Area
  - Total: 60 km^{2} (23 sq mi)

Population (2005)
  - Total: 3,390
  - Density: 56/km^{2} (150/sq mi)
- Demonym: Jesusmarienses
- Time zone: UTC-5 (Colombia Standard Time)
- Website: www.jesusmaria-santander.gov.co

Jesús María is a town and municipality in the Santander Department, in northeastern Colombia.

The township was founded in the mid-18th century and was elevated to the city status in 1870 following rapid population growth. In 1887, it was officially designated as a municipality.
