= El Crucero de Santa María =

Village in Jalisco, Mexico

El Crucero de Santa María is a village in the municipality of San Martín de Hidalgo in the state of Jalisco, Mexico. It has a population of 3,228 inhabitants.
