= Ipazoltic =

- Interactive map of Ipazoltic
- Coordinates: 20°26′00″N 103°59′15″W
- Country: Mexico
- State: Jalisco
- Foundation: c. 1540

Government
  - Type: Municipal Agency
- Elevation: 1,200 m (4,100 ft)

Population (2000)
  - Total: 510
- Time zone: UTC-6 (Central Standard Time)
  - Summer (DST): UTC-5 (Central Daylight Time)
- Website: http://ipazolticjal.ning.com/

Ipazoltic (Nahuatl languages: Ipazoltic "among herbs") is a town in the municipality of San Martín de Hidalgo in the Mexican state of Jalisco. It is located 500 km West of the capital, Mexico City. There are about 533 inhabitants located in Ipazoltic.

Its foundation dates back to the pre-conquest times, having been inhabited by the Tepehuán peoples.
