= Labor de Medina =

Town in Jalisco, Mexico

Coordinates: 20°28′N 103°55′W

Labor de Medina is a town in the municipality of San Martín de Hidalgo in the state of Jalisco, Mexico. It has a population of 863 inhabitants.
