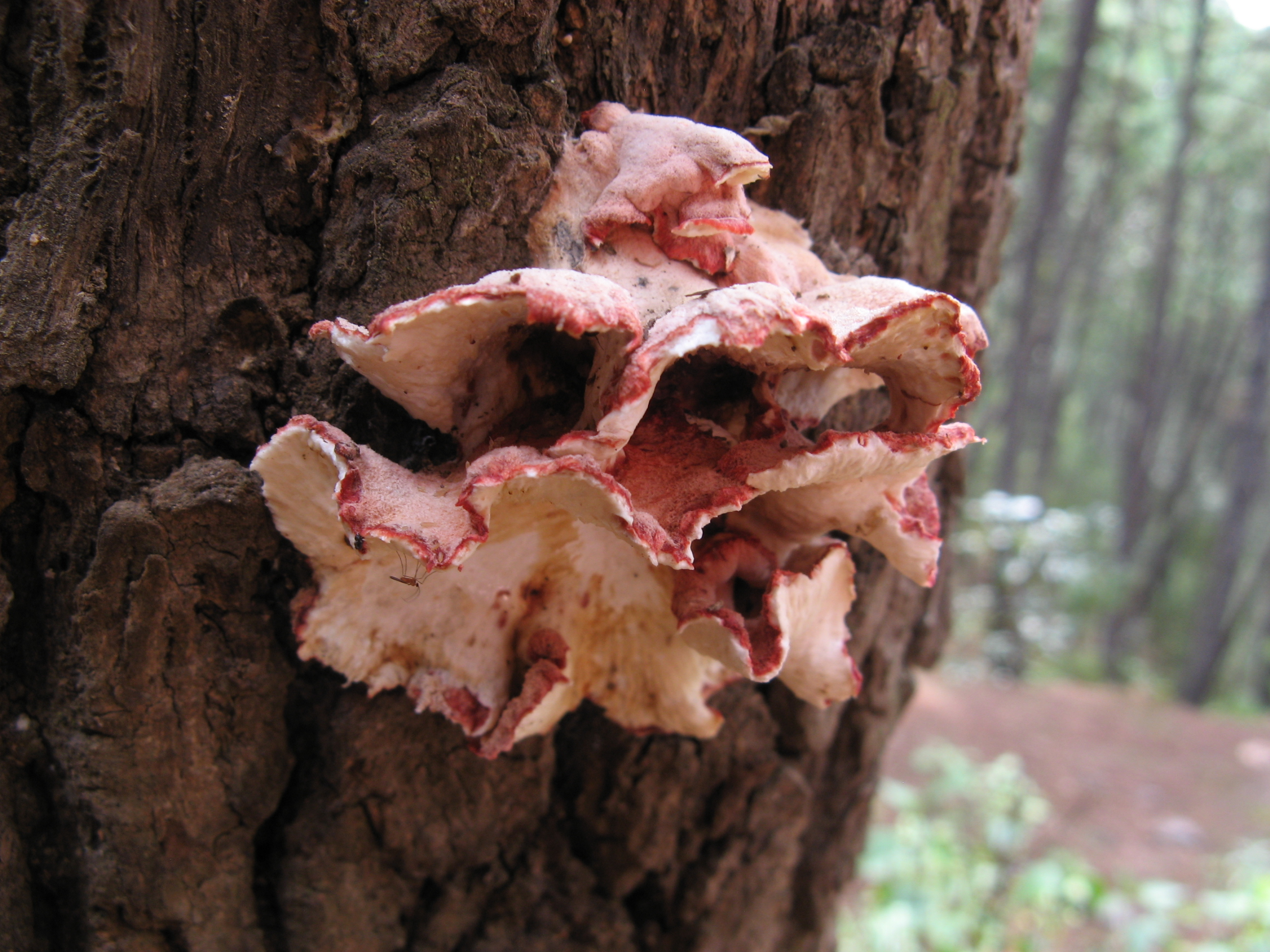

Scientific classification
- Kingdom: Fungi
- Division: Basidiomycota
- Class: Agaricomycetes
- Order: Polyporales
- Family: Meruliaceae
- Genus: Phlebia
- Species: P. incarnata

Binomial name
- Phlebia incarnata (Schwein.) Nakasone & Burds. (1984)

Synonyms
- Merulius incarnatus Schwein. (1822); Cantharellus incarnatus (Schwein.) Schwein. (1832); Sesia incarnata (Schwein.) Kuntze (1891); Merulius tremellosus f. incarnatus (Schwein.) Parmasto (1967); Byssomerulius incarnatus (Schwein.) Gilb. (1974)

= Phlebia incarnata =

Species of fungus

Phlebia incarnata
- Mycological characteristics
- Pores on hymenium
- Cap is offset
- Hymenium attachment is not applicable
- Lacks a stipe
- Spore print is white
- Ecology is saprotrophic
- Edibility is inedible

Phlebia incarnata is a species of polypore fungus in the family Meruliaceae. It is inedible.

== Taxonomy ==
The species was originally described as Merulius incarnatus by Lewis David de Schweinitz in 1822. In its taxonomic history, it has been transferred to the genera Cantharellus (1832), Sesia (1891), and Byssomerulius (1974), and renamed as a form of Merulius tremellosus. It was transferred to Phlebia in 1984 when Nakasone and Burdsall synonymized Merulius with Phlebia.

== Description ==
The coral pink cap is roughly semi-circular and 2–6 centimetres (3/4–2 1/4 in) wide and fuzzy when dry. The spore print is white.

Phlebia tremellosa can appear similar.

== Distribution and habitat ==
It can be found in eastern North America from June to January on hardwood stumps and logs.
