= Los Vergara =

Human settlement in Mexico

Coordinates: 20°27′N 103°55′W

Los Vergara is a town in the municipality of San Martín de Hidalgo in the state of Jalisco, Mexico. It has a population of 269 inhabitants.
