= Cocollán =

Pre-Columbian Nahua confederacy in Mexico

Chiefdom of Cocollán Cacicazgo de Cocollán
- 1100–1521
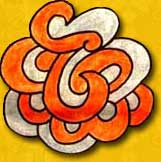
- Coat of arms
- Capital: Cocollán
- Common languages: Coca
- Government: Chiefdom
- Chief
  - 1100–?: Huehuetztlatzin
  - 1510–1521: Citlali
- Historical era: Pre-Columbian
  - Established: 1100
  - Disestablished: 1521
- Currency: Tribute
Succeeded by
Viceroyalty of New Spain

The Chiefdom of Cocollán (meaning "place of undulations") was a pre-Columbian state founded by Coca tribes in present-day central Jalisco, Mexico.

== Foundation ==
The ancient Chiefdom of Cocollán was founded by Coca tribes, former residents of the Chiefdom of Tonalá, sometime during the 12th century by Huehuetztlatzin. Cocollán's tributaries were Santa Ana Acatlán, Tizapanito (present-day Villa Corona), Xilotepetque, Tecolotlán, Atengo, and Tenamaxtlán.

In the language of the Coca people, Cocollán is written as "Cocolhui".

The city of Cocollán was destroyed in the 16th century, which caused the inhabitants to move westward toward near what is now Tlajomulco de Zúñiga in 1509. The Tlajomulcans drove the Cocolláns off their territory, and they transported back to their old site in Santa Ana Acatlán, where they stayed until 1519.

In 1519, the Cocolláns went back to the top of a mountain that runs from east to west in order to build the town of Cocollán again, where they remained until the arrival of the Spanish.

In 1521, with Citlali as cacique, Cocollán was discovered and conquered by the Spaniard Alonso de Avalos, who incorporated it into the Avalos Province.

== Rulers ==
- Huehuetzlatzin
- Citlali (meaning "star") was the last of the Cocollán chiefs. He participated in the Salitre War.

== Subjugated villages ==
- Acatlán (present-day Acatlán de Juárez)
- Tizapanito (present-day Villa Corona)
- Xilotepetque
- Tecolotlán
