= Martín Huitzingarit =

Huitzingarit (c. 1500 – c. 1570), later baptized as Martín Santiago, was the last principal chief of the indigenous settlement of Huitzquilic, present-day San Martín de Hidalgo, Jalisco.

He was a member of the Tepenahuales, a group of Nahua Aztecs who were on their way to Zacatula (Colima) when they decided to settle the San Martín de Hidalgo area. The first Spanish conquistadores came in 1540, during his time as chief, and humbly he and his people seceded their town and possessions to the Spanish newcomers. For his nobleness, the Spanish named him Captain and gave him a part of the portion of the land seceded.

Today, in honor of the chief, there is a street in San Martín de Hidalgo called "Martín Huitzingarit"
