= Río Grande, Jalisco =

Mexican town in a Jaliscoan municipality

Coordinates: 20°22′16″N 103°57′36″W

Río Grande is a town in the municipality of San Martín de Hidalgo in the state of Jalisco, Mexico. It has a population of 141 inhabitants.
