= San Jerónimo Dam =

- Location within Mexico
- Official name: Presa San Jerónimo
- Location: San Jerónimo, Jalisco, Mexico
- Coordinates: 20°23′59″N 103°59′13″W
- Construction began: 2008
- Opening date: February 10, 2009
- Construction cost: 8,461,000 pesos
- Operator: San Martín de Hidalgo

Dam and spillways
- Impounds: Arroyo Las Minas
- Website http://app.jalisco.gob.mx/

The San Jerónimo Dam (Spanish: Presa San Jerónimo) is a dam located near the hill of La Tecolota in the town of San Jerónimo, Jalisco, Mexico. The dam was built at a cost of 8,461,000; it was inaugurated on February 10, 2009, by the state governor Emilio González Márquez.

== Cause of construction ==
The dam was built to relieve the serious problem of the community's need of public water. The dam is planned to supply water for the approximately 700 homes in the community. The dam will also seek to promote aquaculture, tourism, and environmental care which may trigger the economic development of the residents.
