= Chiefdom of Ameca =

Pre-Columbian state in Mexico

Chiefdom of Ameca Cacicazgo de Ameca
- 1325–1522
- 1579 map of the Ameca region.
- Capital: Ameca (Cuauhtépetl)
- Common languages: Cazcan, Totonac, Nahuatl
- Government: Chiefdom
- Chief
  - c. 1325: Xoxouhqui Tequani
  - c. 1522: Huitzil
- Historical era: Pre-Columbian
  - Established: 1325
  - Disestablished: 1522
- Currency: Tribute
Succeeded by
Viceroyalty of New Spain
- Today part of: Mexico

The Chiefdom of Ameca (Spanish: Cacicazgo de Ameca) is the name given to a pre-Columbian state that encompassed the Valley of Ameca in central Jalisco, Mexico. The word Ameca is of Cazcan origin and means "above the water".

== History ==
Xoxouhqui Tequani (meaning "brave lion") was a feared indigenous chief from a far, unspecified coastal region who settled the area with his people circa 1325. He is attributed as the founder of the Chiefdom of Ameca and its dynasty which spanned five generations. Xoxouhqui Tequani never became a vassal of his powerful comrade Caltzoncin, chief of Pátzcuaro, because of his bravery and expert warfare. Xoxouhqui Tequani's sons, grandsons, great-grandsons, and great-great grandsons succeeded him as chiefs of Ameca, until 1522. Huitzil, Xoxouhqui Tequani's descendant, was the last of the chiefs of Ameca. His great-grandson, don Martín Cortés, became governor of Ameca during the late 16th century.

== Conquest ==
The seat of Amecatl was discovered by Juan de Añesta in 1522 who arrived barefoot and alone with a sword in his hand. The residents of Amecatl surrendered peacefully to the conquistador because they thought he was the son of the sun, as their ancestors had predicted that he would come to conquer and that all would be subject to him and pay tribute.

Until 1529, Fray Antonio de Cuélla along with other missionaries and Spaniards settled in the town of Amecatl and built an adobe chapel, royal house, plaza, jail, hotel, and houses in what is now central Ameca, Jalisco.

Though the population of Ameca spoke the Cazcan and Totonac languages by 1579, they generally used Nahuatl (mexicano). The connection between the Totonac language of Ameca and the Totonac languages of the Gulf Coast is unconfirmed since the former is completely unattested, and the geographical distance between the two makes such a connection unlikely unless Totonac arrived in Jalisco with the Spanish conquerors. It should also be noted that the term Totonac may have the etymology "people of the hot land", and thus could simply have been used as a generic geographic qualifier.

== Gastronomy ==
Maize, which was either boiled or roasted, was the staple food of the Amecans; it was the main ingredient for their cuisine which included tamales (tamalli) and atole (cacalotl or izquitl). Their diet also included pumpkins, beans, chili peppers, and chives. They hunted deer, rabbits, fowl, small dogs (chichitones), snakes, mice, badgers, and big cats; the game meat was cooked in holes with many pebbles. Pulque, an intoxicating milk-like drink from the maguey plant, was a popular beverage. They gathered red and yellow plums, mezquites, zapotes, guamúchiles, avocados, guavas, and bananas.
