= Jesús María (El Zapote) =

Town in San Martín de Hidalgo, Mexico

Coordinates: 21.9630°N 102.3442°W

Jesús María, also known as El Zapote, is a town in the municipality of San Martín de Hidalgo in the state of Jalisco, Mexico. It has a population of 278 inhabitants.
