= El Tepehuaje de Morelos =

Town in Jalisco, Mexico

Coordinates: 20.435°N 103.915°W

El Tepehuaje de Morelos is a town in the municipality of San Martín de Hidalgo in the state of Jalisco, Mexico. It has a population of 2,331. The town was named after Mexican independence insurgent José María Morelos.
