= Lagunillas, Jalisco =

Lagunillas
- Interactive map of Lagunillas
- Coordinates: 20°20′23″N 103°59′45″W
- Country: Mexico
- State: Jalisco
- Foundation: c. 1870

Government
  - Type: Municipal Agency
  - Municipal Agent: Oscar Alberto Monroy Monroy
  - Sub-agent: Adrían Monroy Salas
- Elevation: 1,990 m (6,530 ft)

Population (2010)
  - Total: 106
- Time zone: UTC-6 (Central Standard Time)
  - Summer (DST): UTC-5 (Central Daylight Time)
- Website: http://lagunillasjal.yolasite.com/

Lagunillas (Spanish pronunciation: [laɣuniʎas]) is a rural town in the municipality of San Martín de Hidalgo in the Mexican state of Jalisco. The town is enclaved in the local and statewide touristic area Sierra de Quila, one of Jalisco's largest protected forests.

Lagunillas is known for its red-colored dirt roads and adobe houses with wooden accents contrasting a solid dark green forest and the silhouette of the Cerro El Huehuentón.

== Toponymics ==
Lagunillas (lah-gun-nee-yahs) in Spanish means "small lakes". The word is a combination of the noun laguna, meaning "lake", and the suffix illa which means "small".

== History ==
Lagunillas was probably founded by a group of settlers who, when searching for farmland, found small freshwater lakes. The town is atop a mesa surrounded by forests of oak and pine trees. The town is still surrounded by the Sierra de Quila, whose beauty symbolizes untouched nature. The population of Lagunillas has had a steady decline due to its rural location, it is currently 106 as of 2010.

== Economy ==
During the peach harvest in Lagunillas, many residents from adjacent towns come to pick peaches for no cost, due to the hospitality of Lagunillas' residents. Maize and agave are farmed, but not in a significant quantity. Orchards of peaches and cherries are the town's agricultural symbol.
