= San Jerónimo (Los Barbosa) =

- Locality and Municipal Agency
- Central view of San Jerónimo

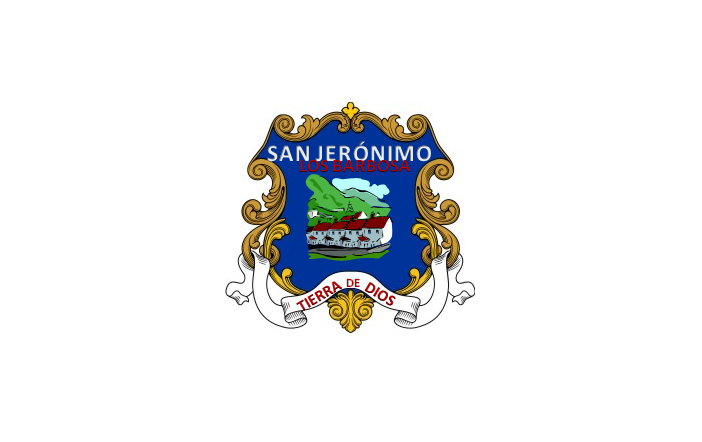
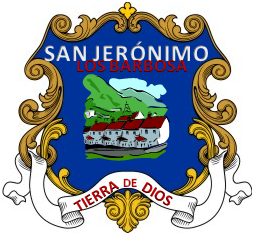
- Flag Seal

- Location in Mexico San Jerónimo (Los Barbosa) (Mexico)
- Coordinates: 20°24′18″N 103°59′12″W
- Country: Mexico
- State: Jalisco
- Region: Valles
- Municipality: San Martín de Hidalgo
- Territorial sub-committee: Santa Cruz de las Flores
- Incorporated: March 25, 1925

Government
  - Type: Municipal Agency
  - Municipal Agent: Armando Díaz
  - Municipal Sub-agent: José Luis Tapia Navarro
- Elevation: 4,842 ft (1,476 m)

Population (2010)
  - Total: 355
  - Rank: 11th in San Martín de Hidalgo Municipality
- Demonym: Barboseño
- Time zone: UTC-6 (Central Standard Time)
  - Summer (DST): UTC-5 (Central Daylight Time)
- Postal code: 46770
- Website: Official website

San Jerónimo (Los Barbosa) is a locality and municipal agency of San Martín de Hidalgo Municipality, Jalisco, Mexico. As of the 2010 census, the village had a total population of 355, making it the eleventh-largest locality in the municipality and the second-largest in the territorial sub-committee.

San Jerónimo is the home of the state-funded San Jerónimo Dam which cost

It is situated 45 miles southwest of Guadalajara, and 80 miles east of Puerto Vallarta.

== History ==
The village of San Jerónimo was first annotated as one of the settlements comprising the jurisdiction of Cocula in 1744. Hometown of Elizabeth Torres.

== Demographics ==
=== 2010 ===
According to the 2010 Censo General de Población y Vivienda, San Jerónimo (Los Barbosa) had a population of 355 inhabitants, of which 164 were male and 191 were female. There were 103 inhabited houses.

Historical population
Year	Pop.	±%
1900	360	—
1910	277	−23.1%
1921	310	+11.9%
1930	428	+38.1%
1940	401	−6.3%
1950	445	+11.0%
1960	458	+2.9%
1970	515	+12.4%
1980	506	−1.7%
1990	494	−2.4%
1995	493	−0.2%
2000	465	−5.7%
2005	341	−26.7%
2010	355	+4.1%
Source: INEGI

== Government ==
San Jerónimo is one of the 18 municipal agencies of San Martín de Hidalgo Municipality and belongs to the territorial sub-committee of Santa Cruz de las Flores. A municipal agent and a municipal sub-agent preside over San Jerónimo in the administrative and representative sense and are appointed and removed by the municipal council.

San Jerónimo is located in the 18th Local Electoral District.

== Agriculture ==
San Jerónimo was incorporated into an ejido on March 25, 1925, with a total of 582 hectares of communal land.

== Unincorporated communities ==
- La Madera, part of the village
- Planta de Beneficio, former settlement outside the village

== Localities ==
- El Cerrito de los Tapia
- La Barranca de San Jerónimo
