= Sierra de Quila =

Flaura and fauna protection area In Mexico

- IUCN category VI (protected area with sustainable use of natural resources)
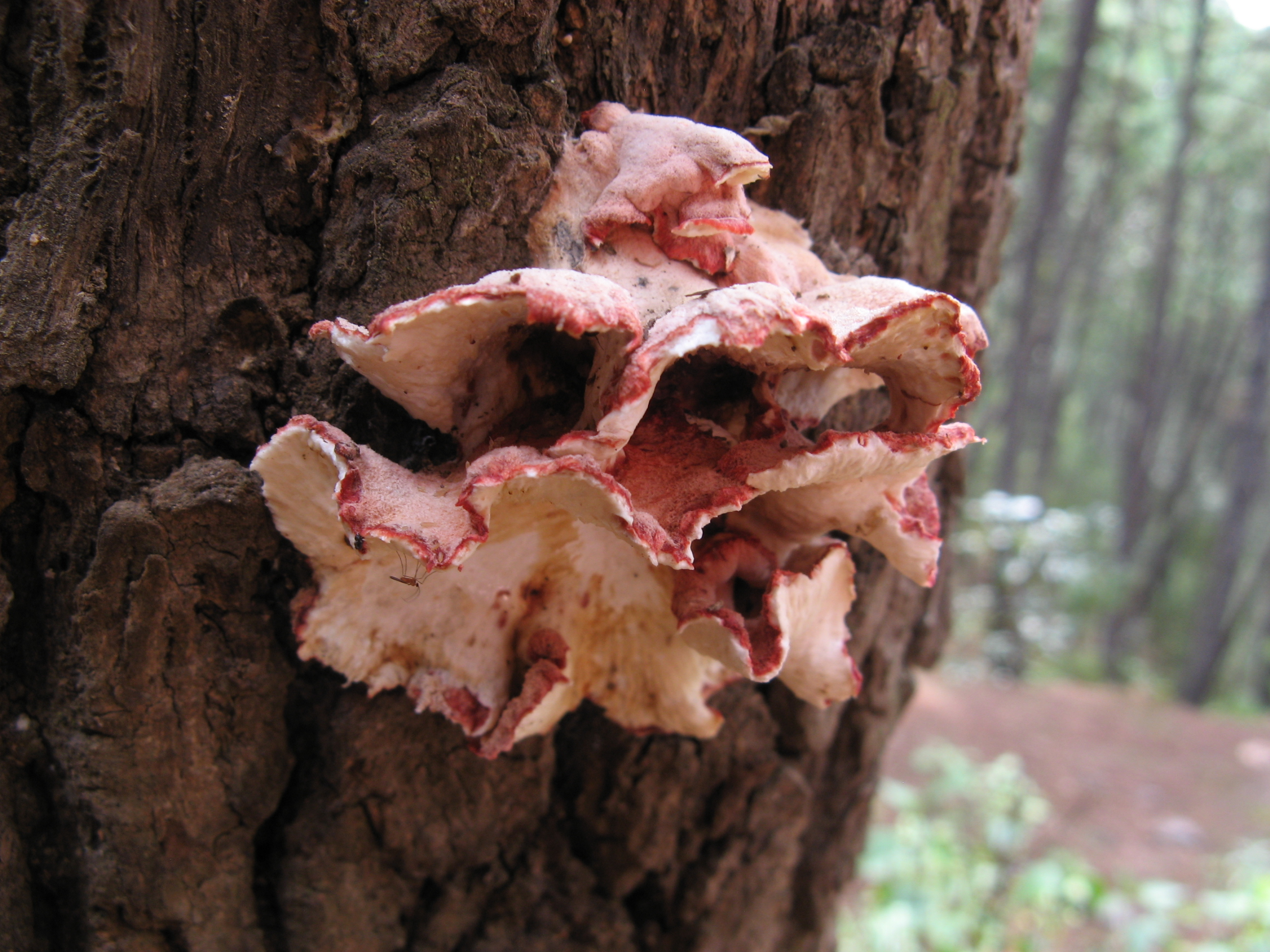
- Phlebia incarnata fungus on a pine tree in Sierra de Quila

- Location within Mexico
- Location: San Martín de Hidalgo, Tecolotlán, Cocula, Atengo, Tenamaxtlán, and Ameca municipalities, Jalisco, Mexico
- Nearest city: Cocula, Jalisco
- Coordinates: 20°18′N 104°01′W
- Area: 16,193 ha (40,010 acres)
- Designation: flora and fauna protection area
- Established: August 4, 1982 (Forested and Faunal Protection Zone); June 7, 2000 (Flora and Fauna Protection Area)
- Governing body: National Commission of Natural Protected Areas (CONANP)
- Website: www.sierradequila.org/sdq/

Sierra de Quila, officially the Sierra de Quila Flora and Fauna Protection Area, is a Mexican Flora and Fauna Protection Area in the state of Jalisco, Mexico. It has an area of 16,193 hectares, and is located within six municipalities: San Martín de Hidalgo, Tecolotlán, Cocula, Atengo, Tenamaxtlán, and Ameca.

The Sierra de Quila is part of the Trans-Mexican Volcanic Belt, a system of mountains that runs east–west through central Mexico. The Sierra de Quila divides the basin of the Ameca River to the north from that of the Armería River to the south.

== History ==
In the 1950s, the inhabitants of Tecolotlán, with the leadership of Gabriel Agraz García de Alba, founded a grouping that had as its principal objective the prevention of forestal exploitation of the area. From 1970 to 1980, more manifestations regarding the prevention of irrational forestal exploitation took place which pressured the municipality of Tecolotlán to create the Pro-Conservation Committee of the Forests and Springs of the Sierra de Quila which protected the natural resources of the area and prohibited clandestine activities within the area.

Sierra de Quila became a "Forested and Faunal Protection Zone" on August 4, 1982. The area was recategorized as a flora and fauna protection area on June 7, 2000, in recognition of its biodiversity and other aspects.

== Geography ==
The Sierra de Quila Flora and Fauna Protection Area contains the springs of La Ciénega, Charco de la Máquina, and Presa del Ahogado; the cascades of Salto de la Campana, Cascada Santa Rosa, Cascada La Ciénega, Salto de Tecolotlán, and Cascada El Columpio; and the viewpoints of Cerro El Huehuentón, Mirador Tecolotlán, and Piedras Blancas.

== Flora and fauna ==
Pine-oak forests, including pine, oak, and mixed pine and oak forests, are the predominant vegetation at higher elevations, along with smaller areas of cloud forest. Tropical dry forest is found at lower elevations.

It has 28 species of mammals, 90 species of birds, 15 species of reptiles, 5 species of amphibians, representing 17% of the vertebrate species registered in the State of Jalisco. Large mammals include white-tailed deer (Odocoileus virginianus), collared peccary (Dicotyles tajacu), and puma (Puma concolor).

== Conservation ==
Sierra de Quila was established as a wildlife protection zone on August 4, 1982. It was the more recent and smaller of the two wildlife protection areas in the state, the other being La Primavera (near Guadalajara). It was re-designated a flora and fauna protection area in 2000, and is managed by the National Commission of Natural Protected Areas (CONANP).
