= Cocula, Jalisco =

Cocula
- Municipality and city
- Cocula
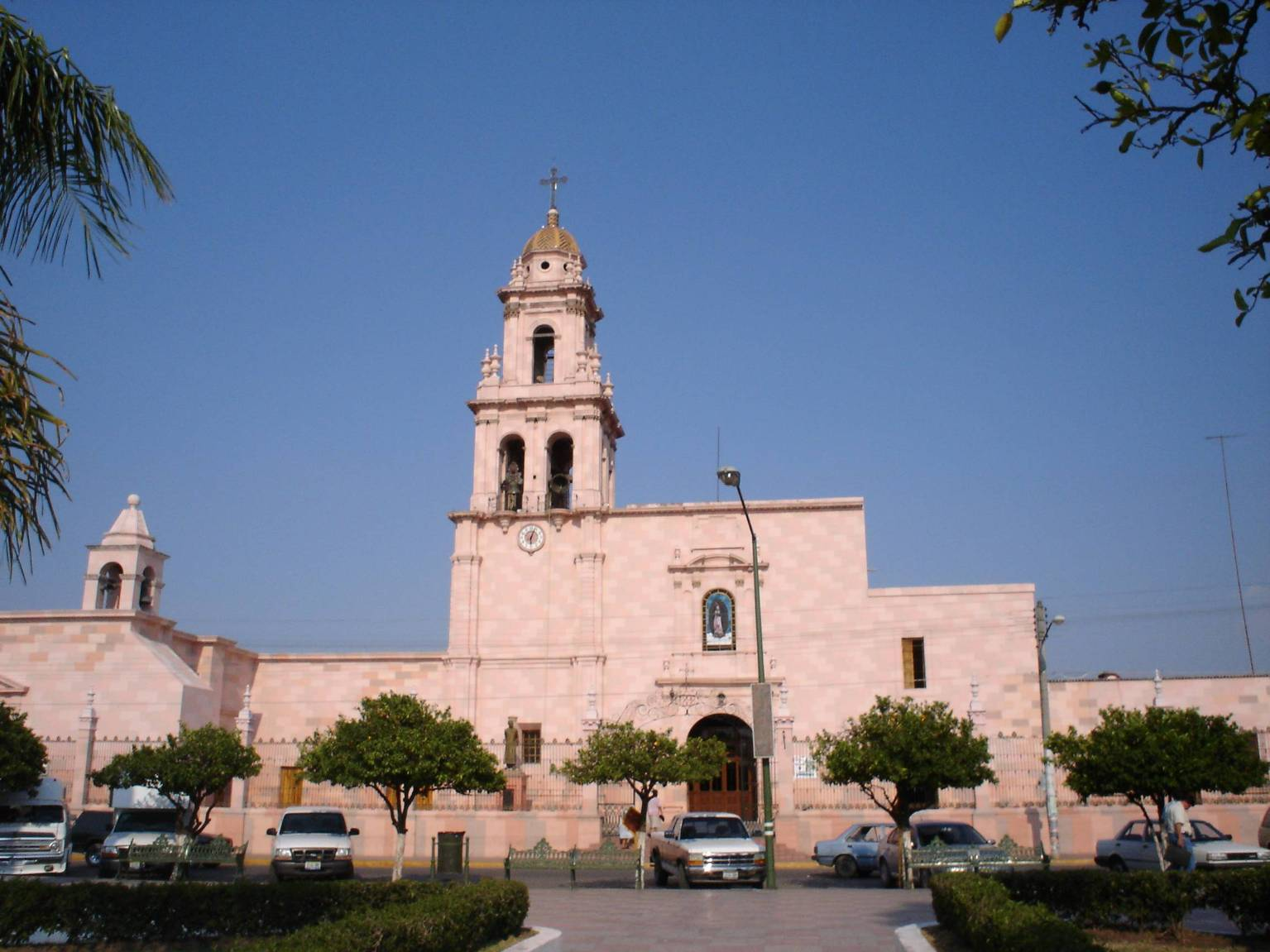
- La plaza in central Cocula.

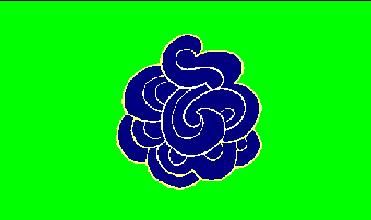
- Flag
- Nicknames: La Cuna del Mariachi "The Cradle of Mariachi"
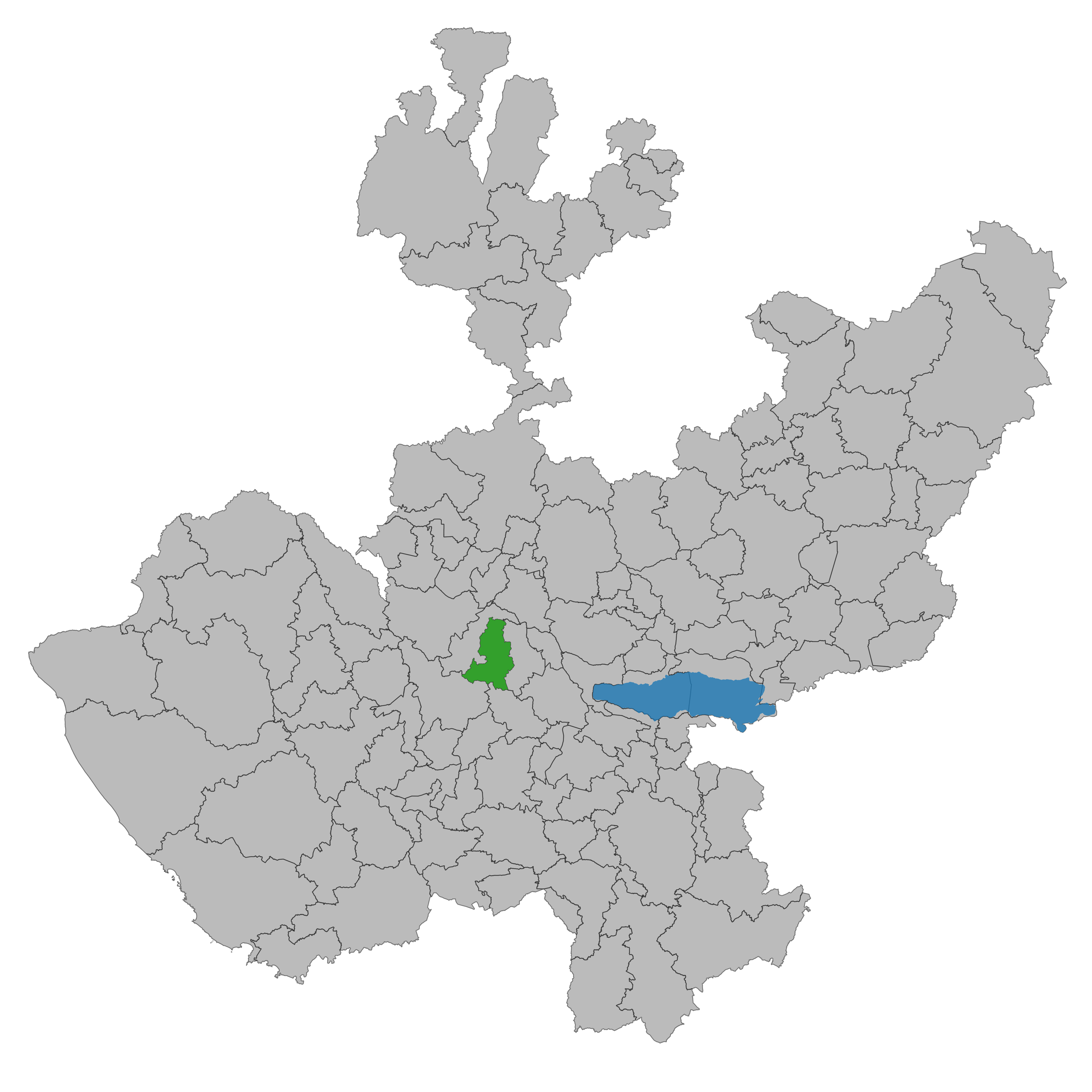
- Location in Jalisco

- Location within Mexico
- Coordinates: 20.365°N 103.822°W
- Country: Mexico
- State: Jalisco
- Municipality: Cocula

Government
  - Municipal president: Miguel Ángel Ibarra Flores; PRI
- Elevation: 1,350 m (4,430 ft)

Population (2020)
  - Total: 29,267
  - City: 16,550
  - Demonym: Coculense
- Time zone: UTC-6 (Central (US Central))
- Postal code: 48500
- Area code: 377
- Website: www.cocula.gob.mx

Cocula (Nahuatl languages: Cocollán "ondulated place") is a city and municipality in the Mexican state of Jalisco. It is located 35 miles (56 km) southwest of Guadalajara, on Mexico Highway 80. It sits at an elevation of 4,460 feet (1,360 m). According to the 2020 census, the population of the municipality was 29,267 with 16,550 inhabitants living in the city. Other important towns in the municipality are Cofradía de la Luz, La Sauceda, and Santa Teresa.

In 2023, Cocula was designated a Pueblo Mágico by the Mexican government, recognizing its cultural and historical importance. Cocula is best known as the birthplace of mariachi.

== Economy ==
The Cocula regional economy is primarily agrarian-based, growing not only maize and agave but also sorghum, chickpeas, alfalfa and mangoes, and is one of the nation's top sugar cane producers. It is also known for the raising of (to a lesser degree) pigs, poultry, goats, chickens, and cattle. Cocula City proper is also the head of local commerce, with a wide range of specialized retailers of food, clothing, housewares, farm & garden supply and construction materials; the city is also the primary center for general regional public services such as banks, hospitals, auto repair shops and other civic industries.

== History ==
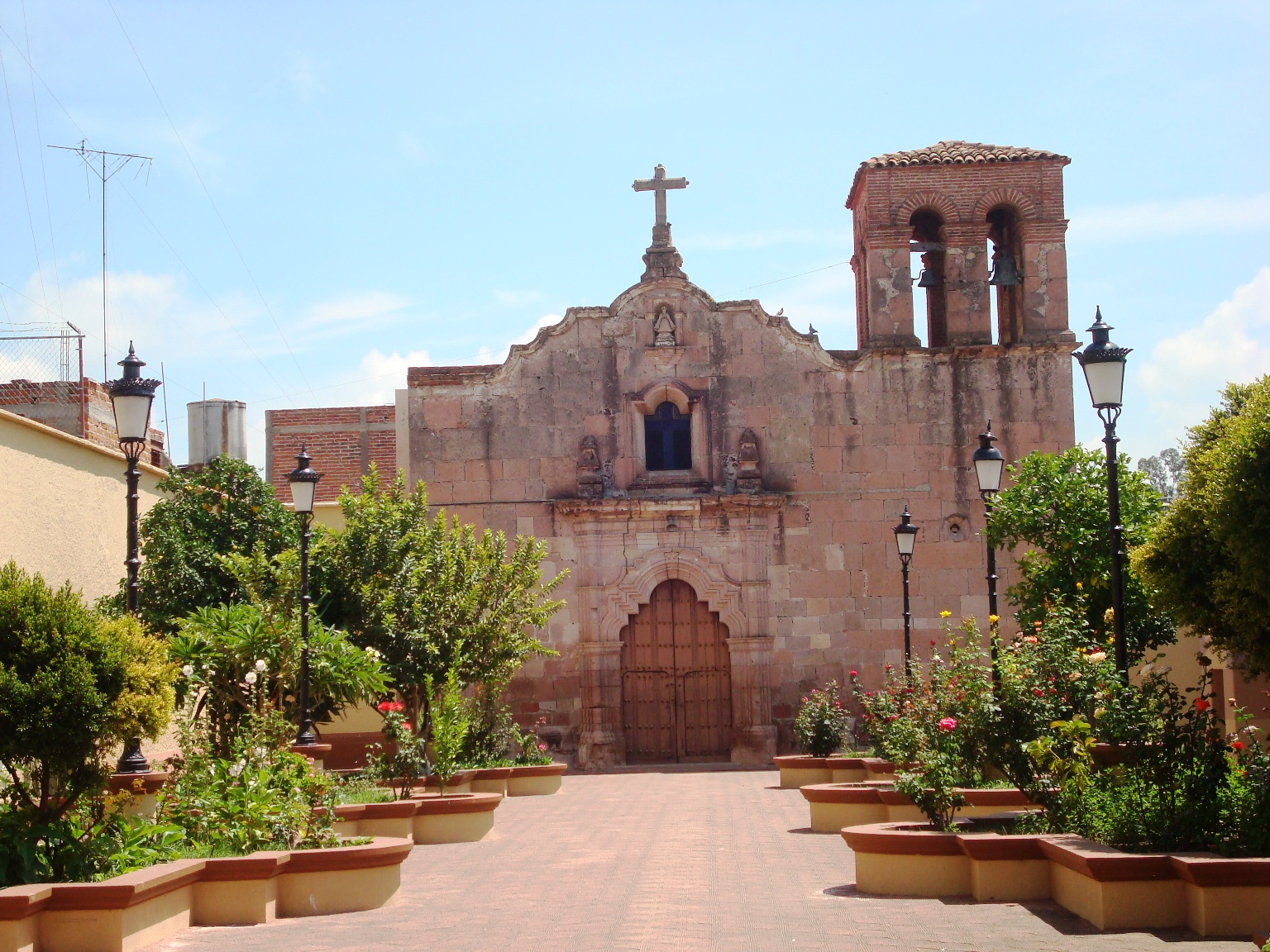
La Purísima is one of the chapels featured for its religious architecture.

Cocula was called originally Cocollán or Cocolán, which has been interpreted to mean "ondulated place." Around the 12th century, some families of the Coca tribe who inhabited the Kingdom of Tonalá were forced to flee the area due to hostility towards them. A group guided by Huehuetztlatzin founded Cocollán in today's Acatlán de Juárez area.

Cocollán was destroyed at the beginning of the 16th century. The survivors tried to establish themselves in the Tlajomulco area a few miles from there but were expelled by the local tribes. They ended up occupying the top of a mountain close to the original Cocollán site where they remained until the arrival of the Spaniards.

By 1520, Cocollán was an independent city under the rule of Chief Citlali (The Star). It had some tributary towns under its control like Acatlan, Villa Corona, Tizapanito, Xilotepetque and Tecolotlán. In 1521, the Spanish army under Alonso de Ávalos conquered Cocollán and surrounding towns and incorporated them into the Avalos Province. A few years later, Franciscan friars persuaded the indigenous inhabitants of the city to relocate to a valley nearby, which is its present location. This is believed to have happened in 1532. There are still remains of the old city, which is referred to as Cocula Vieja (Old Cocula).

In 1833, Cocula was declared a city.

== Culture ==
Cocula is referred to as "La Cuna del Mariachi," or "The Cradle of Mariachi," given that mariachi music originated there in the 19th century. As one enters or exits Cocula, two large arches, featuring two guitars or violins, bear the inscription "Bienvenidos a Cocula, Cuna Mundial del Mariachi." Many well known mariachi groups have come from Cocula and surrounding areas. A famous Mexican Artist named Jorge Negrete sang a song called "Cocula" that talks about this town and how mariachi originated there.

== Government ==
=== Municipal presidents ===
Municipal president	Term	Political party	Notes
José Corona Ochoa	1914		
José Sánchez N.	1916		
Gabriel H. Tortolero	1916–1917		
José María Castillo Jiménez	1918–1919		
Juan O. Hernándezz	1918–1922		
Pablo Preciado	1922		
Francisco M. Díaz García	1924		
Salvador Molina Rojas	1925		
Juan V. Grajeda	1926		
Sóstenes Castillo	1927		
Gerardo Rodríguez Tapia	1932	PNR	
Francisco Pérez Camacho	1934–1935	PNR	
Luis Vargas Pulido	1935	PNR	
Tomás Ramírez	1936	PNR	
Aurelio Aréchiga Rubio	1936	PNR	
Pablo Vázquez Barboza	1937	PNR	
Celerino Acosta Vargas	1938	PRM	
J. Ventura Virgen	1940	PRM	
José de Jesús Aréchiga Terán	1941–1942	PRM	
Ignacio Arriola Ochoa	1943–1944	PRM	
Encarnación Vázquez Nuño	1945	PRM	
José Agustín Valdez Vázquez	1946	PRI	
José Guadalupe Acosta Bañuelos	1946	PRI	
Francisco Ixtláhuac Aréchiga	1947–1948	PRI	
Celerino Acosta Vargas	1949	PRI	
Enrique Acosta Tortolero	1950–1951	PRI	
José Raimundo Ibarra Rodríguez	1953–1954	PRI	
Celerino Acosta Vargas	1955	PRI	
Guadalupe Ibarra R.	1956–1958	PRI	
Miguel Allende Morales	1959–1960	PRI	
Juan Ramírez Nuño	1960–1961	PRI	
Francisco Vázquez Vázquez	1962	PRI	
Manuel Terán Mariscal	1964	PRI	
J. Jesús Águila Díaz	1965–1967	PRI	
Enrique Silva Plazola	1967	PRI	Acting municipal president
Rafael Montelongo Rangel	01-01-1968–31-12-1970	PRI	
J. Luis López Ibarra	01-01-1971–31-12-1973	PRI	
Carlos Ramírez Corona	01-01-1974–31-12-1976	PRI	
José Ixtláhuac Virgen	01-01-1977–31-12-1979	PRI	
Jorge Virgen Serrano	01-01-1980–31-12-1982	PRI	
Rafael Vázquez Amador	01-01-1983–1985	PRI	
Carlos E. Arriola Pérez	01-01-1986–31-12-1988	PRI	
J. Luis Ibarra Moreno	01-01-1989–1992	PRI	
J. Luis Facundo Guerrero	1992–1995	PRI	
Arturo Facundo Ramírez	1995–1997	PRD	
Juan Carlos Orozco Flores	01-01-1998–31-12-2000	PRD	
Gustavo Cabral González	01-01-2001–31-12-2003	PAN	
Antonio Vázquez Medina	01-01-2004–31-12-2006	PAN	
Arturo Facundo Guerrero	01-01-2007–31-12-2009	PRD; PT	
Héctor de Jesús Castillo Andrade	01-01-2010–30-09-2012	PAN	
Félix Alberto Ibarra Vázquez	01-10-2012–30-09-2015	PAN	
Francisco Javier Buenrostro Acosta	01-10-2015–30-09-2018	PRI; PVEM	
Miguel de Jesús Esparza Partida	01-10-2018–05-03-2021	PT; Morena; PES	
Miguel Ángel Ibarra Flores	01-10-2021–30-09-2024	PRI	

== Notable people ==
- Sabás Reyes Salazar, Mexican Catholic priest and martyr during the Cristero War (1888–1927)

== Gallery ==
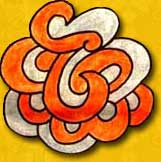
Cocollán (Hieroglyphic)

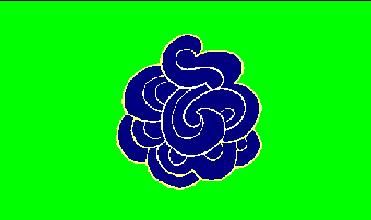
Unofficial Flag of Cocula

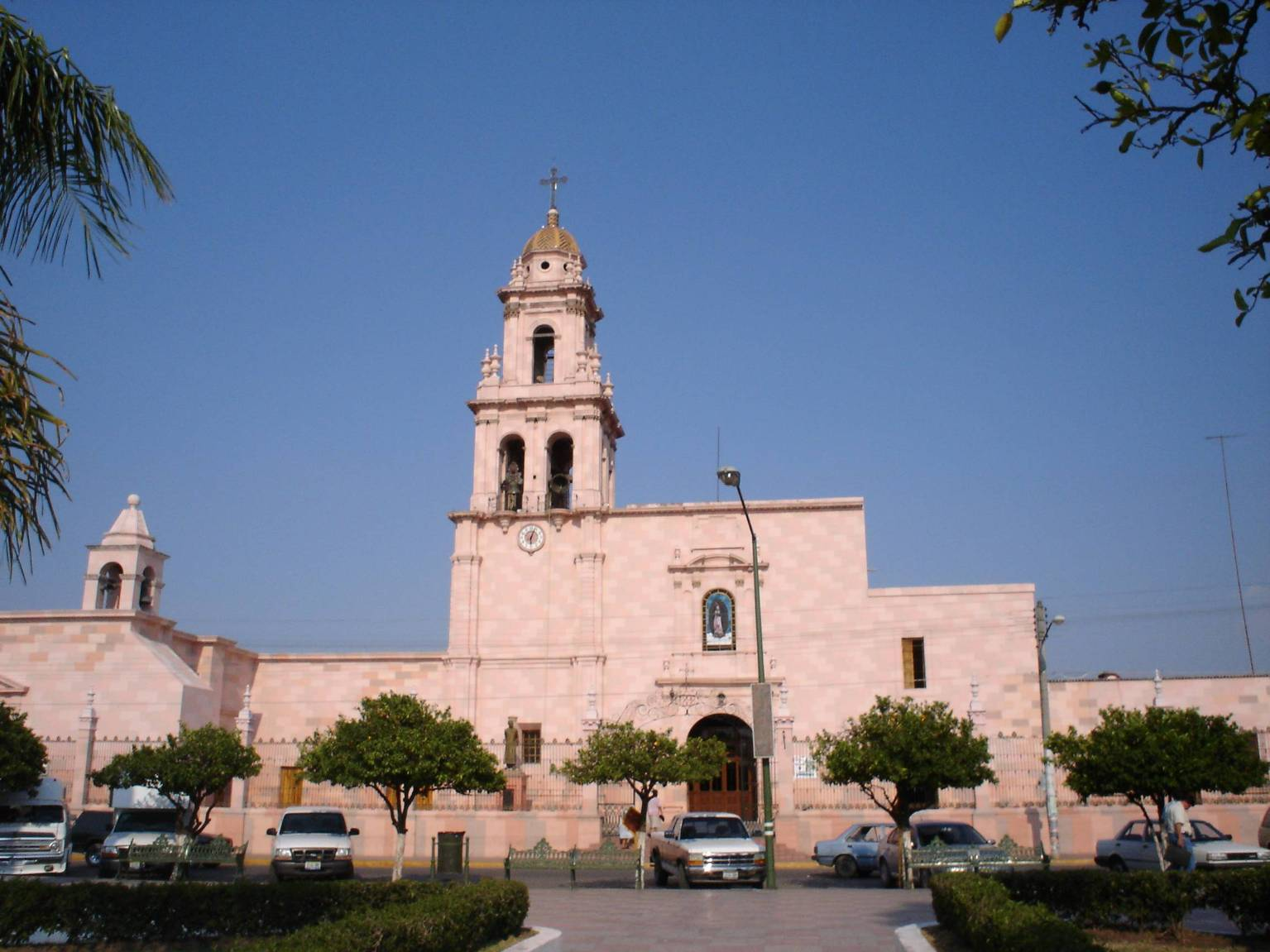
Parroquia de San Miguel Arcángel

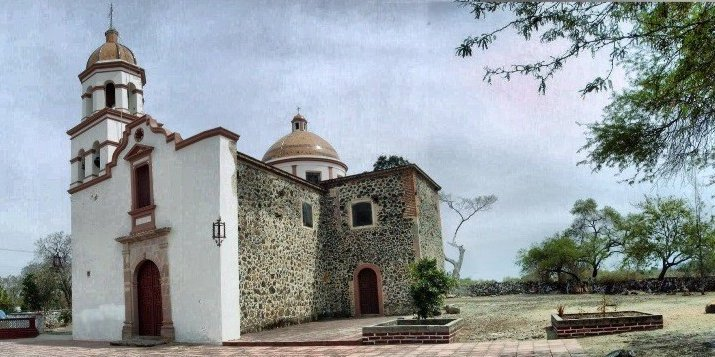
Templo de la Cruz

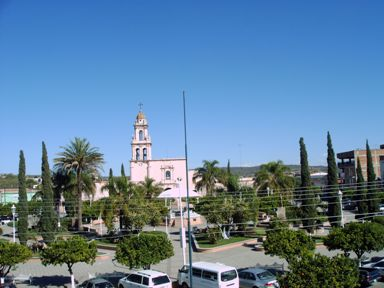
Plaza principal

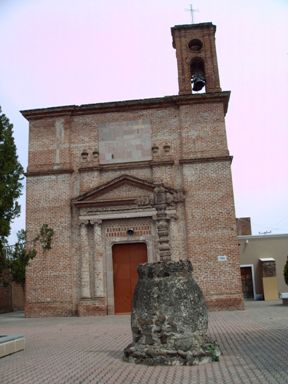
Templo de San Juan

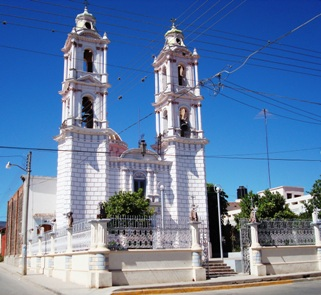
Templo de San Pedro

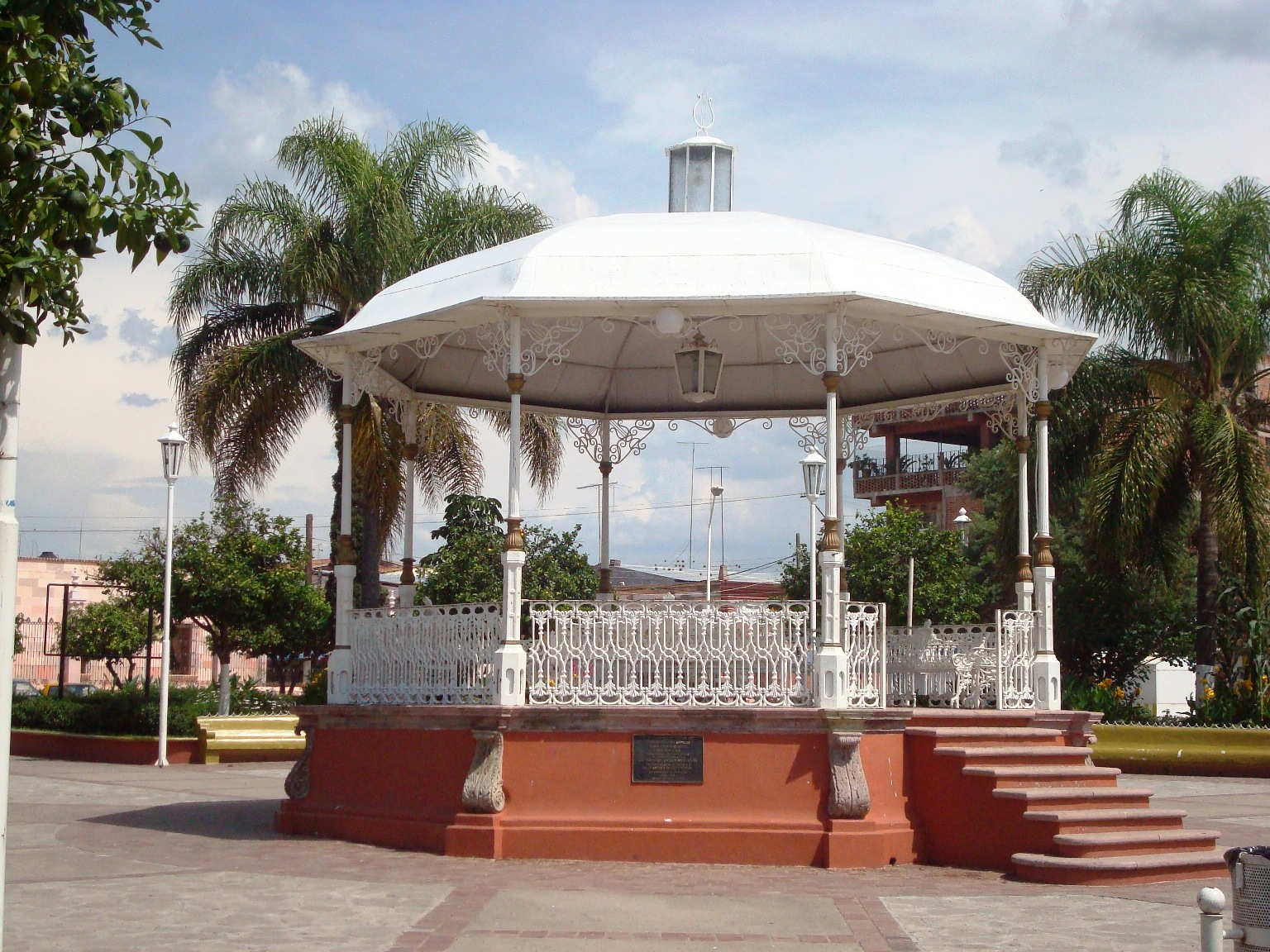
Kiosco

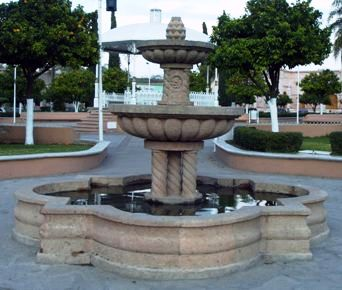
Fuente

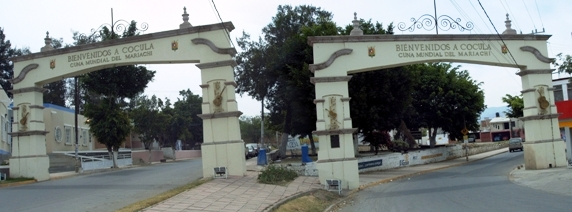
Entrada y salida principales

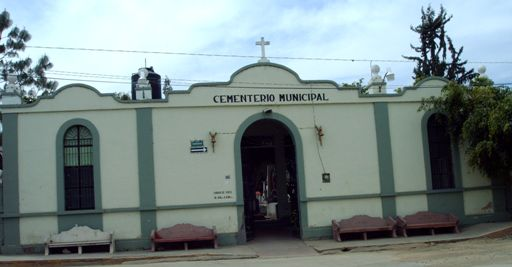
Cementerio Municipal

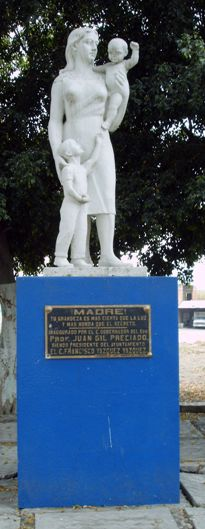
Monumento a La Madre

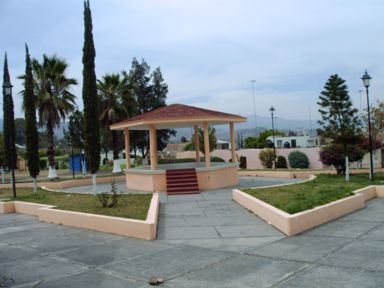
Plaza de Villa de Cázarez

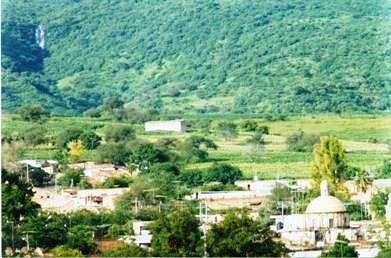
El Salto

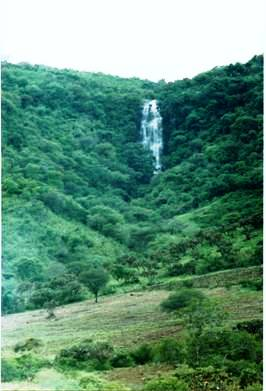
El Salto

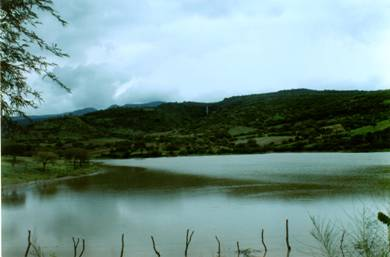
Presa

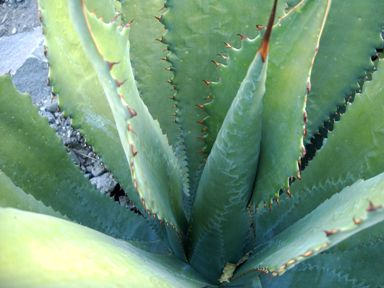
Maguey

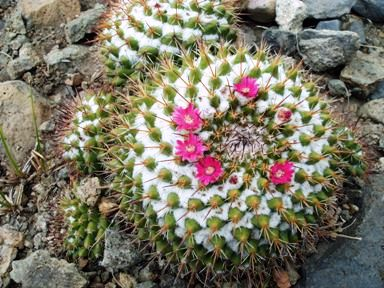
Biznaga
