= San Martín de Hidalgo =

San Martín Hidalgo, Jalisco
- Town
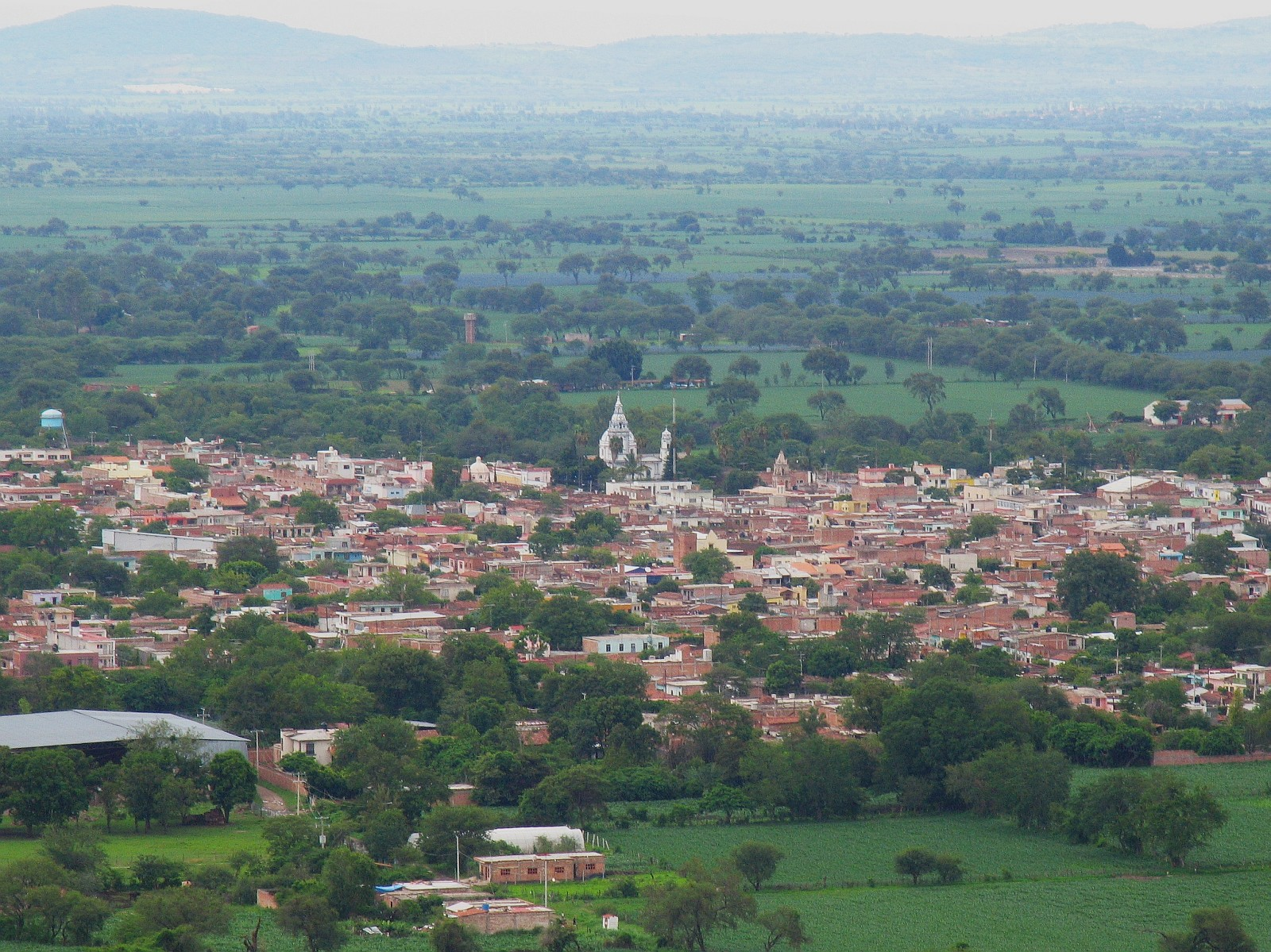

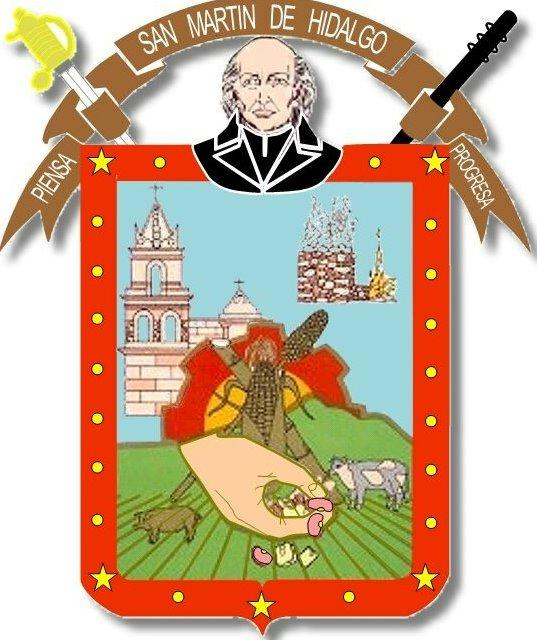
- Coat of arms

- Location in Mexico San Martín Hidalgo, Jalisco (Mexico)
- Coordinates: 20°26′06″N 103°55′43″W
- Country: Mexico
- State: Jalisco
- Region: Lagunas
- Municipality: San Martín de Hidalgo
- Founded: 1540

Government
  - Mayor: Moisés Rodríguez Camacho (Citizens' Movement)

Area
  - Town: 3.59 km^{2} (1.39 sq mi)
  - Municipality: 324.57 km^{2} (125.32 sq mi)
- Elevation: 1,309 m (4,295 ft)

Population (2020 census)
  - Town: 28,102
  - Density: 7,830/km^{2} (20,300/sq mi)
- Demonym: Sanmartinense
- Time zone: UTC-6 (Central Standard Time)
- Website: Official website

San Martín de Hidalgo, formerly San Martín de la Cal, is the largest town and municipal seat of San Martín de Hidalgo Municipality, in Jalisco in central-western Mexico. As of 2015, the town had a population of 7,819. It is located 16 km (10 miles) southeast of the city of Ameca and 13 km (8 miles) northwest of the city of Cocula.

Tourism in San Martín de Hidalgo mainly relies on either architecture, hiking, or gastronomy.

== Toponymy ==
During the Pre-Columbian era, the town's name was Huitzquilic, which is the Nahuatl word meaning "place of thistles".

== History ==
In 1480, the Coca, Purépecha, and Tepenahuales people settled in Huitzquilic. Under the leadership of Amecatl, present day Ameca, Jalisco, Huitzquilic was ruled by Huitzingarit. The Spanish discovered the town in 1540, during their arrival. The Spanish conquistadors baptized Huitzingarit, the leader, giving him the name of "Martín Santiago Huitzingarit". Because of Huitzingarit's humility, the conquistadors awarded him with a plot of land and the title of captain.

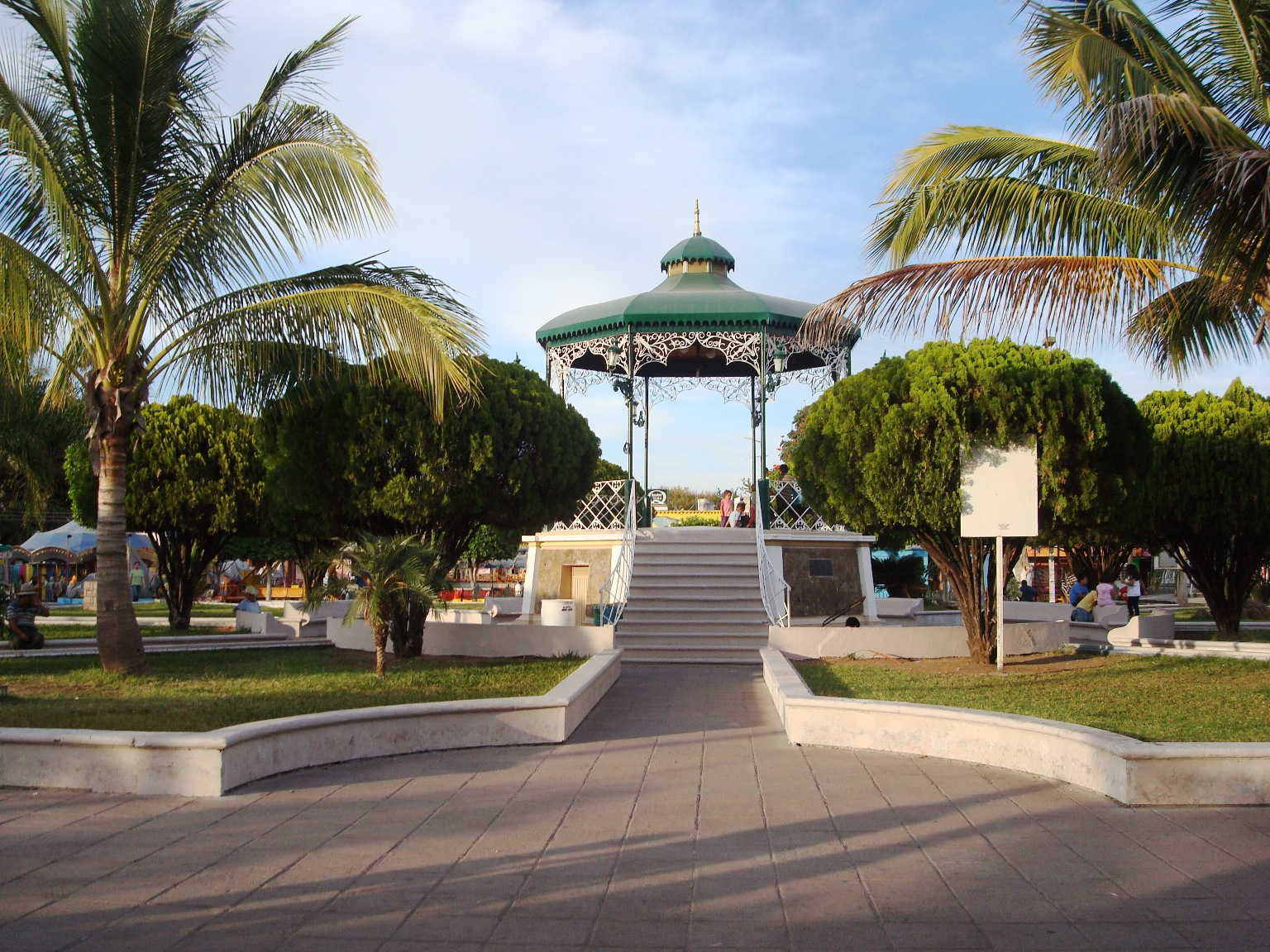
Plaza de Armas

Since being the chief of his town, Huitzingarit's baptismal name was the basis for the new name of the new Spanish settlement, San Martín. The town was later known as "San Martín de la Cal", because of the area's abundance in lime. By 1823, the town is mentioned as a free municipality. It was not until 1883, that "San Martín de la Cal" is changed to "San Martín de Hidalgo", in honor of Miguel Hidalgo y Costilla "the father of the nation".

Venustiano Carranza, President of Mexico, visited San Martín de Hidalgo during the Mexican Revolution in 1916.

== Tourism ==
San Martín de Hidalgo is notable for the following touristic attractions and natural features.

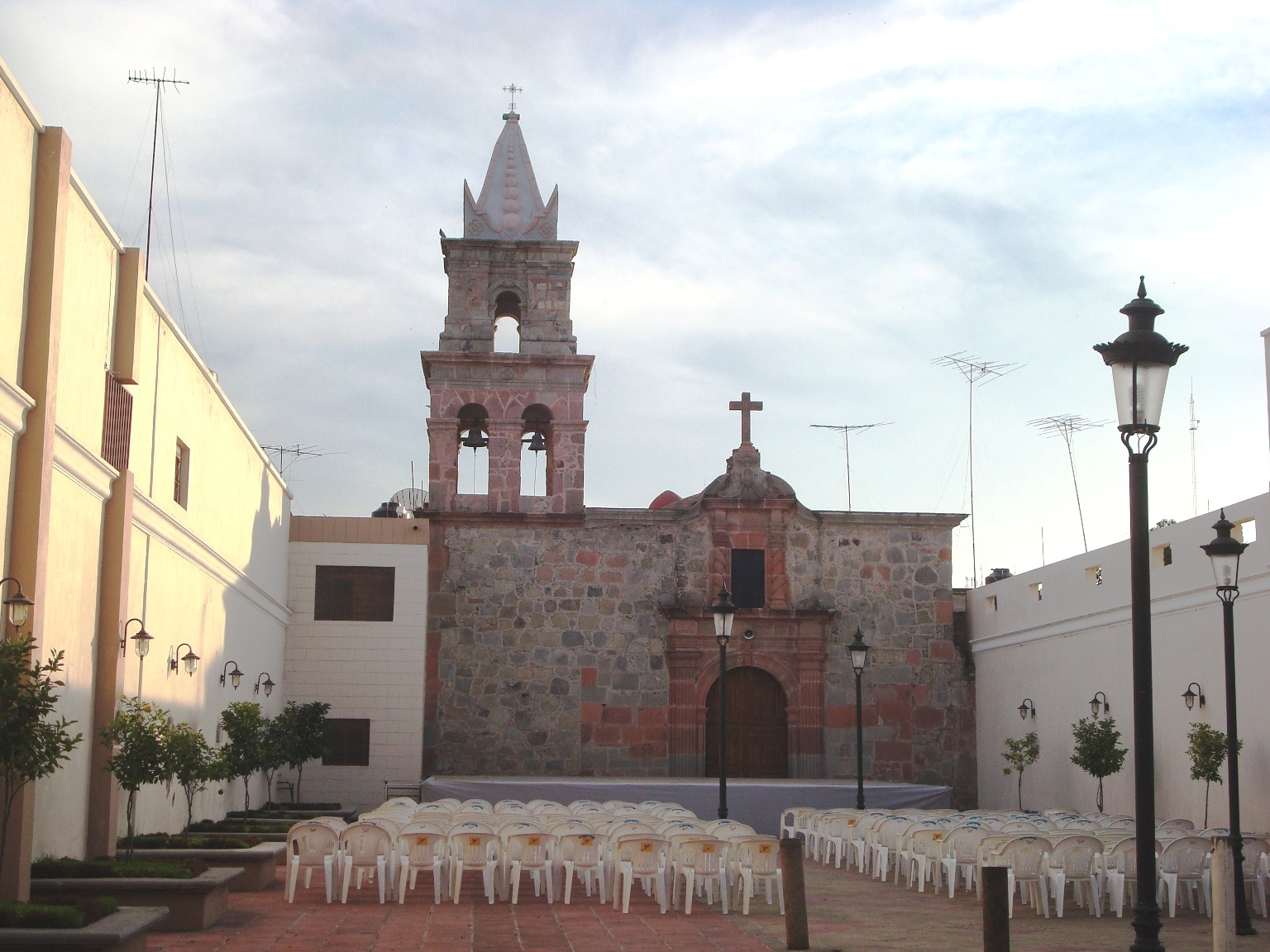
La Conchita

=== Architecture ===
- La Capilla de la Concepción, also known as La Conchita, was first utilized as a hospital for the Tepenahuales of the area in the mid-1500s. It is the oldest standing building in the town, the Capilla faces the principal cathedral.
- La Parroquia de San Martín de Tours was built along with the "portales" and the "Plaza de Armas" in 1883, when the town was ranked as a free municipality.
- Templo del Calvario a church in the southern part of the town.
- Los Portales are a collection of two elongated buildings that display arched columned porches on their facades. On the portales, many businesses including shops and restaurants are located. The western portal is sometimes referred to as Portal Zaragoza.
- La Gran Tenoxititlán a grocery store that bears a dignified Neoclassical style that was popular during the 1800s.

=== Geography ===
- Sierra de Quila a large government-protected forest that contains Oak, Pine, and Redwood trees. The towns of Mesa del Cobre, El Cobre, and Lagunillas neighbor the breath-taking forest.
- Presa del Guaje a dam near the municipal seat. It is perhaps the largest dam in the municipality, if not the region.
- Presa San Jerónimo newly built dam inaugurated by the state's governor, it is located in the southwestern part of the municipality.

=== Feasts ===
Civil holidays

- Parade of floats. 16 September.
- Parade of floats. 20 November.
- The Melon Fair. Mid-May. (Community of El Salitre)
- The Luminaries. 11–12 December.
- The Riders (Las Paseadoras). 15 August.
- Tianguis Saturday. The Saturday before Holy Week.
- Feast from 3 to 11 November 2013.
- Easter (Resurrection Sunday).

Religious feasts

- Feast in honor of the Lord of El Tepehuaje. 16–24 January.
- Feast in honor of the Lord of El Encino, Easter Monday.
- Feast in honor of the Lord of Forgiveness. Week following that of Easter.
- Feast in honor of the Saint Joseph. Sunday closest to 15 May.
- The Holy Family. 29 December.
- The Shepherds (Los Pastores). 25, 26, and 27 December.
- Feast in honor of Our Lady of Guadalupe. 12 December.
- Laying of Christs (sculptures of Jesus on the cross). Holy Thursday and Good Friday.
- Feast in honor of Our Lady of the Rosary. Third Sunday of January.
- Pilgrimage to the Virgin of Candelaria. 2 February.
- Feast in honor of Saint Martin de Tours. 3–11 November.
- Feast in honor of Saint Raphael Archangel. 29 September.
- Feast in honor of Saint Cecilia. 22 November.
- Pilgrimage of the Lord of El Encino from El Crucero de Santa María to San Jacinto. 15 August.
- Feast in honor of the Virgen del Rosario in Santa Cruz. Last Sunday in October.

The Riders (Las Paseadoras), 15 August.
Ancient tradition of the town of San Martín Hidalgo, which is celebrated year after year on 15 August, consists of riding (hence the name) on horseback through the different streets of the town and nearby towns: Tepehuaje, Santa Cruz de las Flores, Cárdenas, and Ipazoltic (in this last population the Virgin of the Assumption is venerated). When asking the elders about the origin of this tradition, they say that in their memories the purpose of this horse riding was to present to the Virgin their daughters who had turned fifteen during the year and it was on horseback that they approached to the municipality seat to attend the mass that was celebrated in honor of the Virgin, because 15 August is the Day of the Virgin of the Assumption. Until a few years ago, groups of cheerful young people who came dressed in their own outfits to ride, the boys wearing their hats and the girls wearing their wide skirts and sitting sideways like Amazons, made a tour visiting the temples of the aforementioned towns. Currently the tradition has changed and now it is young people dressed in cowboy style who horse ride through the streets of the town accompanied by musical bands and end their tour in the square where the party ends.

The Luminaries, 11–12 December.
It is during the night of 11 to 12 December when the town of San Martín de Hidalgo and some of its communities are perfumed with the smell of ocote that comes down from the Sierra de Quila in advance and that many merchants sell during those days. The activities of this tradition are carried out in the following way: the neighbors usually light a small fire with ocote branches and firewood, in front of their houses. While the fire burns down, families and friends gather around the flames for a pleasant evening among talks and savoring, roasted pumpkin seeds, guasanas (cooked tender chickpeas), peanuts, popcorn, and some even roasted meat, listen to music, talk or pray to the Virgin of Guadalupe, since 11 December is the eve of the celebration of this invocation of the most revered Virgin of the Mexican people, and San Martín is no exception. Its origin according to legend arises from this festival on 12 December and what the tradition of apparitions tells. We do not know how, but it is said that the ancestors of the inhabitants of that region knew the news of the apparitions and with lights they waited for the miracle.

The Laying of Christs (Los Tendidos de Cristos), Good Friday of each year.
These activities began in the second half of the 17th century. They had their origins in the neighborhoods of San Pedro and La Flecha ("The Arrow"), and then continued also in Centro and La Cruz Verde ("The Green Cross"), as a consequence of the conversion of the Amerindians of the place to Catholicism by Spanish missionaries. It is a unique tradition in the Mexican Republic.

Dozens of families in the town have a sculpture of Christ each. They build simple "chapels" with palm leaves inside the houses, a few days before Good Friday, every year. The christs measure from 2 feet and 4 inches (70 centimeters) to 5 feet and 9 inches (1.75 meters) in height; some are light, made of corn cane paste; others, made of wood, weigh up to 220 pounds (100 kilograms), complete with cross.

In the town of San Martín Hidalgo there are 18 sculptures of Christ with documented antiquities from the 17th to the 19th century, according to information provided by Sergio Zepeda Navarro, chronicler and director of Culture of the San Martín de Hidalgo Municipality. In addition, there are dozens of contemporary figures of Christ, from the 20th century. Fourteen days before Good Friday, people sow seeds of wheat, chia, canary grass and maize, in pots or in soil and sawdust, so that the sprouts are ready on Holy Thursday and Good Friday.

Until 2017, on Holy Wednesday, the "bath of Christ" was held in the Chapel of Calvary, with water, soap and scouring pads. Then there is a procession to the atrium of the parish of San Martín de Tours, to change the sendals (thin fabrics), for clean ones, actions in charge of men, who represent Joseph of Arimathea, and then the priest proceeds to officiate a mass. The custom of bathing the images began in 1961, when the town's parish priest was the presbyter Manuel Villagrana Ascencio. When he was removed, around 1972, these actions ceased, but were resumed in 2001 on the recommendation of the priest Luis Zúñiga; however, in 2016 or 2017 people from the Escuela de Conservación y Restauración de Occidente (ECRO, Western Conservation and Restoration School), in Guadalajara, went to San Martín Hidalgo, analyzed the images and found damage. They suggested that the effigies no longer be bathed. Cleanings are currently carried out with essences and oils.

On Good Friday, families get up very early to go to the hill or to the banks of the San Martín River, in order to cut branches of ahuehuete, willow, and rockrose, to place them against the back wall from the living room of their houses. A petate is placed on the floor, as a base, to cover it with alfalfa, chamomile, laurel and rosemary leaves, as well as split bitter oranges and cloves. The sprouts are removed from the pots or from the ground, and spread directly on everything mentioned above. They bring cages with doves, alluding to the Holy Spirit. Also, some families accommodate twelve candles, 33 votive candles, five Easter candles (some others place a few candles), and put a brazier, with charcoal, and copal or incense, to aromatize the environment.

On Good Friday some families, according to the particular custom of each one, pray the rosary, or sing "El Alabado" (The Praised One). For visitors, the entrance to the houses is free of charge, certain families give away drinks such as coffee or lemonade. Generally the first impression is olfactory, then comes the visualization of the arrangements, taking pictures, etcetera. The number of registered tourists has grown, from about eight thousand in 2012, to approximately 30 thousand in 2018. They come from Brazil, Colombia, Panama, Peru, Ecuador, Italy, the United States, Israel. As for domestic tourism, they have come from Querétaro, Michoacán, Nayarit, Colima, Puebla, Oaxaca, Mexico City, Sinaloa, Sonora, and other municipalities in Jalisco.

== In popular culture ==
- In the Mexican telenovela of Querida Enemiga, the protagonist "Lorena de la Cruz" (Ana Layevska) and the antagonist "Sara de la Cruz" (Carmen Becerra), were said to have been born in San Martín de Hidalgo. This was revealed in an episode where the protagonist's mother Zulema (Socorro Bonilla) was giving her daughter's birth information to the police.
- In 2006, Meza Video Productions filmed the video San Martin de Hidalgo for their "Videos de Mexico" series. The direct-to-video movie revolved around the sightseeing in the town as well as residents' interviews about the locale. It was released on DVD the same year.

== Demographics ==
Historical population
Year	Pop.	±%
1900	3,243	—
1960	5,242	+61.6%
1970	6,106	+16.5%
1980	5,777	−5.4%
1990	6,858	+18.7%
1995	7,060	+2.9%
2000	7,464	+5.7%
2005	7,001	−6.2%
2010	8,092	+15.6%
2015	7,819	−3.4%
2020	8,850	+13.2%
Source: Censo 1900 Sedeur City Population

=== 2010 ===
According to the 2010 Censo General de Población y Vivienda, San Martín de Hidalgo had a population of 8,092 inhabitants, of which 3,907 were male and 4,185 were female. There were 2,205 inhabited houses.

== Sister cities ==
- Morgan Hill, Santa Clara County, California, United States

== Notable people ==
- María Guadalupe Urzúa Flores, Municipal President of San Martín de Hidalgo, from 1998 to 2000
