= 19th federal electoral district of Jalisco =

Federal electoral district of Mexico

Jalisco's 19th
- Electoral district of the Chamber of Deputies of Mexico

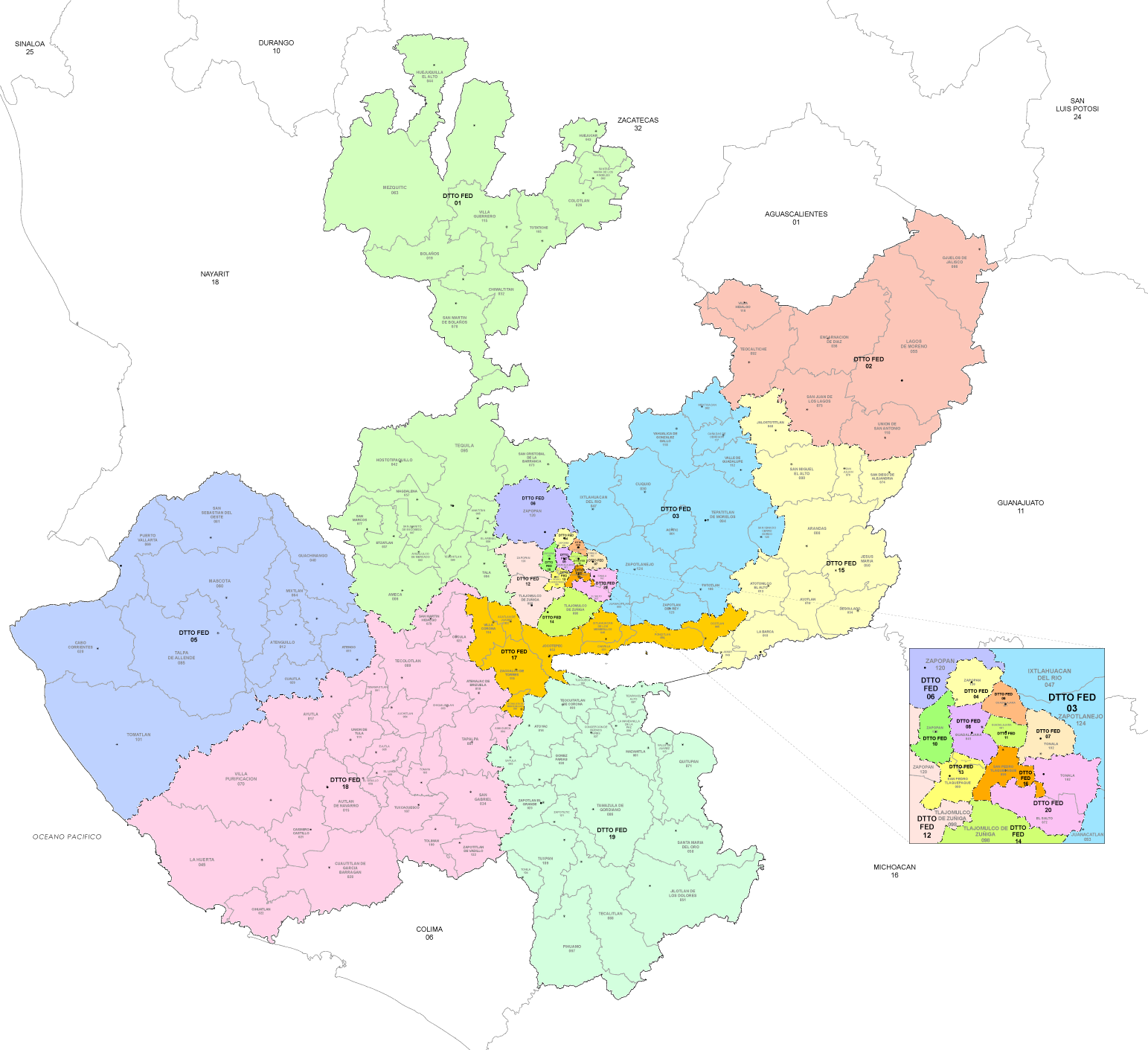
- 19th district

Incumbent
- Member: Clara Cárdenas Galván
- Party: ▌Morena
- Congress: 66th (2024–2027)

District
- State: Jalisco
- Head town: Ciudad Guzmán
- Coordinates: 19°42′N 103°28′W
- Covers: 20 municipalities: Atoyac, Concepción de Buenos Aires, Gómez Farías, Jilotlán, Santa María del Oro, La Manzanilla de La Paz, Mazamitla, Pihuamo, Quitupan, Sayula, Tamazula, Tecalitlán, Teocuitatlán, Tizapán el Alto, Tonila, Tuxcueca, Tuxpan, Valle de Juárez, Zapotiltic, Zapotlán el Grande
- PR region: First
- Precincts: 279
- Population: 413,620 (2020 census)

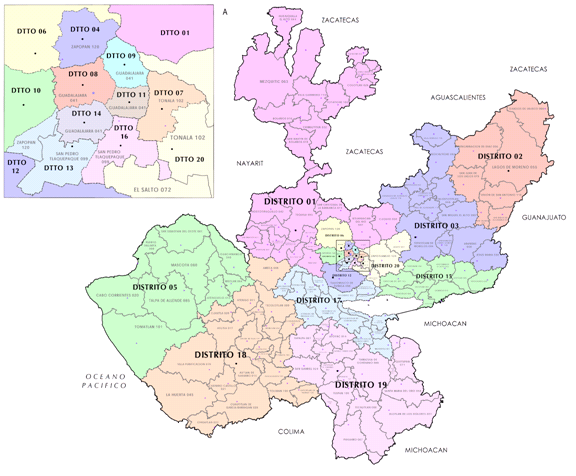
Jalisco's districts in 2017–2022

The 19th federal electoral district of Jalisco (Spanish: Distrito electoral federal 19 de Jalisco) is one of the 300 electoral districts into which Mexico is divided for elections to the federal Chamber of Deputies and one of 20 such districts in the state of Jalisco.

It elects one deputy to the lower house of Congress for each three-year legislative session by means of the first-past-the-post system. Votes cast in the district also count towards the calculation of proportional representation ("plurinominal") deputies elected from the first region.

Suspended in 1930, (Note: An amendment to Article 52 of the Constitution in 1928 changed the original provision of "one deputy per 60,000 inhabitants" to "one deputy per 100,000"; as a result, the size of the Chamber of Deputies fell from 281 in the 1928 election to 171 in 1934.) the 19th district was re-established as part of the 1977 electoral reforms. The restored district returned its first deputy in the 1979 mid-term election.

The current member for the district, elected in the 2024 general election, is Clara Cárdenas Galván of the National Regeneration Movement (Morena).

== District territory ==
Under the 2023 districting plan adopted by the National Electoral Institute (INE), which is to be used for the 2024, 2027 and 2030 federal elections, Jalisco's 19th district covers the south of the state, bordering Colima and Michoacán and the southern shore of Lake Chapala. It comprises 179 electoral precincts (secciones electorales) across 20 of the state's 125 municipalities:

- Atoyac, Concepción de Buenos Aires, Gómez Farías, Jilotlán de los Dolores, Santa María del Oro, La Manzanilla de La Paz, Mazamitla, Pihuamo, Quitupan, Sayula, Tamazula de Gordiano, Tecalitlán, Teocuitatlán de Corona, Tizapán el Alto, Tonila, Tuxcueca, Tuxpan, Valle de Juárez, Zapotiltic and Zapotlán el Grande.

The head town (cabecera distrital), where results from individual polling stations are gathered together and tallied, is the city of Ciudad Guzmán, the municipal seat of Zapotlán el Grande. The district reported a population of 413,620 in the 2020 census.

== Previous districting schemes ==
Evolution of electoral district numbers
	1974	1978	1996	2005	2017	2023
Jalisco	13	20	19	19	20	20
Chamber of Deputies	196	300				

2017–2022

Jalisco regained its 20th congressional seat in the 2017 redistricting process. The 19th district's head town was at Ciudad Guzmán and it covered 18 municipalities:
- Amacueca, Atoyac, Gómez Farías, Jilotlán de los Dolores, Santa María del Oro, Pihuamo, Quitupan, San Gabriel, Sayula, Tamazula de Gordiano, Tapalpa, Tecalitlán, Techaluta de Montenegro, Tonila, Tuxpan, Valle de Juárez, Zapotiltic and Zapotlán el Grande.

2005–2017

Under the 2005 plan, Jalisco had 19 districts. This district's head town was at Ciudad Guzmán and it covered 16 municipalities:
- Amacueca, Gómez Farías, Jilotlán de los Dolores, Santa María del Oro, Pihuamo, San Gabriel, Sayula, Tamazula de Gordiano, Tapalpa, Tecalitlán, Tolimán, Tonila, Tuxpan, Zapotiltic, Zapotitlán de Vadillo and Zapotlán el Grande.

1996–2005

In the 1996 scheme, under which Jalisco lost a single-member seat, the district had its head town at Ciudad Guzmán and it comprised 18 municipalities:
- Ciudad Guzmán, San Gabriel, Concepción de Buenos Aires, Gómez Farías, Jilotlán de los Dolores, Manuel M. Diéguez, La Manzanilla de La Paz, Mazamitla, Pihuamo, Quitupan, Tamazula de Gordiano, Tecalitlán, Tolimán, Tonila, Tuxpan, Valle de Juárez, Zapotiltic and Zapotitlán de Vadillo

1978–1996

The districting scheme in force from 1978 to 1996 was the result of the 1977 electoral reforms, which increased the number of single-member seats in the Chamber of Deputies from 196 to 300. Under that plan, Jalisco's seat allocation rose from 13 to 20. The restored 19th district's head town was at Tamazula de Gordiano and it covered 16 municipalities:
- Concepción de Buenos Aires, Gómez Farías, Jilotlán de los Dolores, Manuel M. Diéguez, La Manzanilla de La Paz, Mazamitla, Pihuamo, Quitupan, Tamazula de Gordiano, Tecalitlán, Tizapán el Alto, Tonila, Tuxpan, Valle de Juárez, Zapotiltic and Zapotitlán de Vadillo.

== Deputies returned to Congress ==
(Mexico) National parties
- Current
- PAN
- PRI
- PT
- PVEM
- MC
- Morena
- PAZ
- Somos
- Defunct or local only
- PLM
- PNR
- PRM
- PNM
- PP
- PPS
- PARM
- PFCRN
- CON
- PANAL
- PSD
- PES
- PES
- PRD

Jalisco's 19th district
Election	Deputy	Party	Term	Legislature
1916	Sebastián Allende		1916–1917	Constituent Congress of Querétaro
1917	José Manzano		1917–1918	27th Congress
1918	Carlos Galindo		1918–1920	28th Congress
1920	Basilio Vadillo		1920–1922	29th Congress
1922	Aurelio Sepúlveda		1922–1924	30th Congress
1924	Julián Villaseñor Mejía		1924–1926	31st Congress
1926	Manuel H. Ruiz		1926–1928	32nd Congress
1928	Manuel H. Ruiz		1928–1930	33rd Congress
The 19th district was suspended between 1930 and 1979
1979	Carlos Martínez Rodríguez	Institutional Revolutionary Party	1979–1982	51st Congress
1982	Óscar Chacón Íñiguez	Institutional Revolutionary Party	1982–1985	52nd Congress
1985	Samuel Orozco González	Institutional Revolutionary Party	1985–1988	53rd Congress
1988	Óscar Chacón Íñiguez	Institutional Revolutionary Party	1988–1991	54th Congress
1991	J. Jesús Núñez Regalado	Institutional Revolutionary Party	1991–1994	55th Congress
1994	Enrique Romero Montaño	Institutional Revolutionary Party	1994–1997	56th Congress
1997	Francisco Javier Santillán Oseguera	Institutional Revolutionary Party	1997–2000	57th Congress
2000	Francisco Javier Flores Chávez	National Action Party (Mexico)	2000–2003	58th Congress
2003	Lázaro Arias Martínez	Institutional Revolutionary Party	2003–2006	59th Congress
2006	Salvador Barajas del Toro	Institutional Revolutionary Party	2006–2009	60th Congress
2009	Alberto Esquer Gutiérrez	National Action Party (Mexico)	2009–2012	61st Congress
2012	Salvador Barajas del Toro	Institutional Revolutionary Party	2012–2015	62nd Congress
2015	José Luis Orozco Sánchez Aldana	Institutional Revolutionary Party	2015–2018	63rd Congress
2018	Alberto Esquer Gutiérrez (Note: Esquer Gutiérrez resigned his seat on 3 December 2018 and was replaced for the remainder of his term by his alternate, Del Toro Pérez.); Higinio del Toro Pérez	Citizens' Movement (Mexico)	2018–2021	64th Congress
2021	Luz Adriana Candelario Figueroa	National Regeneration Movement	2021–2024	65th Congress
2024	Clara Cárdenas Galván	National Regeneration Movement	2024–2027	66th Congress

== Presidential elections ==
Jalisco's 19th district
Election	District won by	Party or coalition	%
2018	Andrés Manuel López Obrador	Juntos Haremos Historia	48.8241
2024	Claudia Sheinbaum Pardo	Sigamos Haciendo Historia	52.9580
