= Sur Region, Jalisco =

Sur Region
- Region
- #6-Sur Region
- Country: Mexico
- State: Jalisco
- Largest city: Ciudad Guzmán

Area
  - Total: 8,182 km^{2} (3,159 sq mi)

Population (2020)
  - Total: 314,489
- Time zone: UTC−6 (CST)

The Sur region is one of the regions of the Mexican state of Jalisco. It comprises 11 municipalities and had a population of 314,489 in 2020.

== Municipalities ==
Municipality code	Name	Population		Land area			Population density	
Municipality code	Name	2020	Rank	km^{2}	sq mi	Rank	2020	Rank
079	Gómez Farías	16,431	7	363	140	9	45/km^{2} (117/sq mi)	4
049	Jilotlán de los Dolores	9,425	10	1,543	596	1	6/km^{2} (16/sq mi)	11
065	Pihuamo	11,368	8	970	370	4	12/km^{2} (30/sq mi)	10
113	San Gabriel	16,548	6	723	279	5	23/km^{2} (59/sq mi)	6
085	Tamazula de Gordiano	38,955	2	1,425	550	2	27/km^{2} (71/sq mi)	5
087	Tecalitlán	16,705	5	998	385	3	17/km^{2} (43/sq mi)	9
099	Tolimán	11,219	9	600	230	6	19/km^{2} (48/sq mi)	8
108	Tuxpan	37,518	3	579	224	7	65/km^{2} (168/sq mi)	3
121	Zapotiltic	33,713	4	289	112	10	117/km^{2} (302/sq mi)	2
122	Zapotitlán de Vadillo	7,466	11	376	145	11	20/km^{2} (51/sq mi)	7
023	Zapotlán el Grande	115,141	1	316	122	10	364/km^{2} (944/sq mi)	1
	Sur Region	314,489	—	8,182	3,159.09	—	38/km^{2} (100/sq mi)	—
Source: INEGI

=== Largest cities ===
Largest cities or towns in Sur Region Source:
Rank		Municipality	Pop.
1	Ciudad Guzmán	Zapotlán el Grande	111,975
2	Tuxpan	Tuxpan	30,471
3	Zapotiltic	Zapotiltic	27,260
4	Tamazula de Gordiano	Tamazula de Gordiano	19,113
5	Tecalitlán	Tecalitlán	13,243
6	San Sebastián del Sur	Gómez Farías	8,909
7	Pihuamo	Pihuamo	6,688
8	San Andrés Ixtlán	Gómez Farías	5,768
9	San Gabriel	San Gabriel	5,109
10	Zapotitlán de Vadillo	Zapotitlán de Vadillo	4,214
