= Santa María del Oro, Jalisco =

Town and municipality in Jalisco, Mexico

Santa María del Oro
- Municipality and town
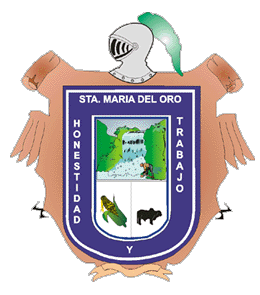
- Coat of arms
- Motto(s): Honestidad y Trabajo (Honesty and Work)
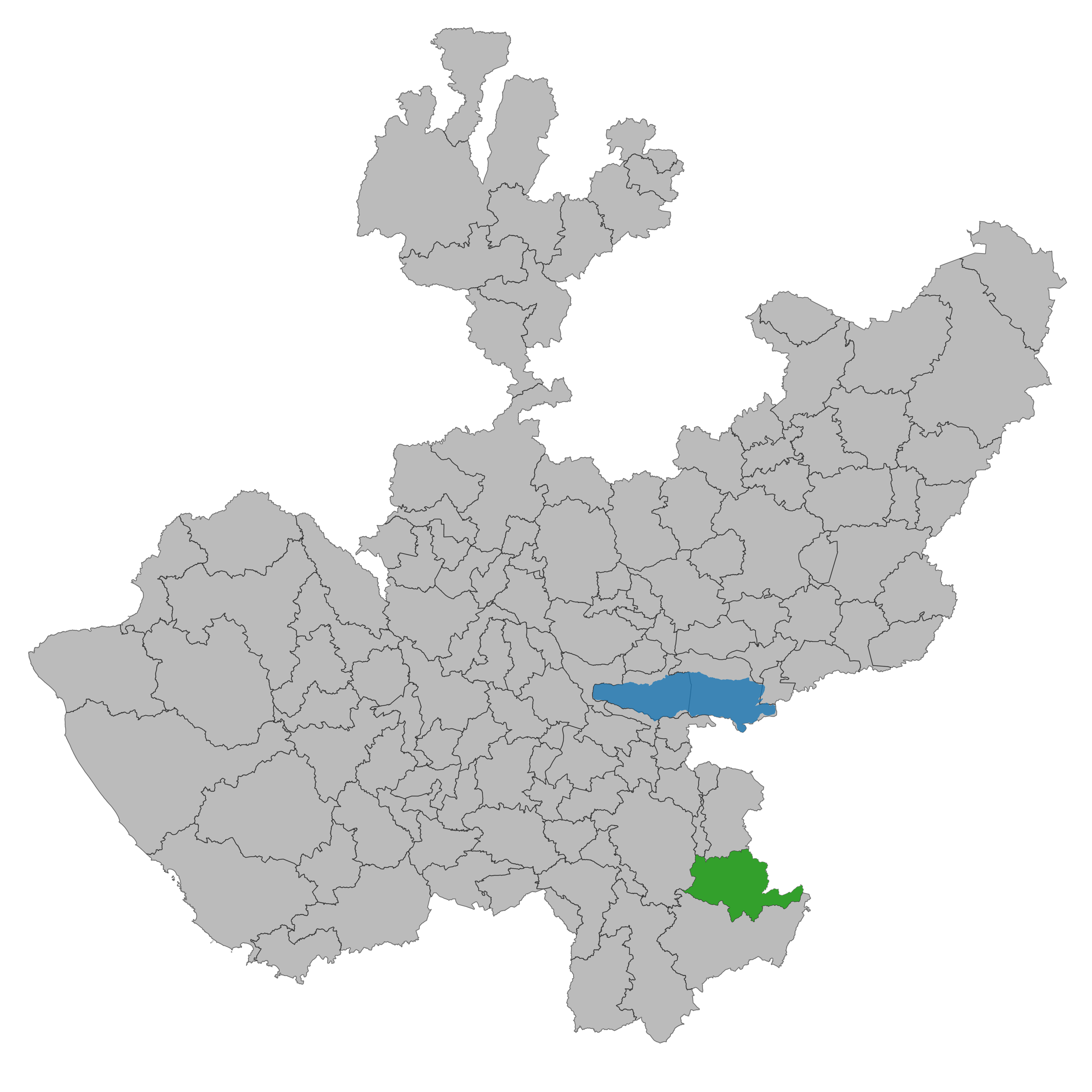
- Location of the municipality in Jalisco

- Location in Mexico
- Coordinates: 19°35′14″N 102°54′35″W
- Country: Mexico
- State: Jalisco
- Municipality: Santa María del Oro
- Its name was then Santa María de Guadalupe (turned a political commyssaryship of the Municipality of Jilotlán de los Dolores): 1 October 1889
- Incorporated as Manuel M. Diéguez Municipality: 6 January 1939
- Name of municipal seat changed to Santa María del Oro: 5 February 1997
- Name of municipality changed to Santa María del Oro: 11 April 1999

Government
  - Type: Municipal
  - Municipal president: Guadalupe Sandoval Farías; PRI

Area
  - Total: 776.4 km^{2} (299.8 sq mi)
  - Town: 0.44 km^{2} (0.17 sq mi)

Population (2020 census)
  - Total: 1,815
  - Density: 2.338/km^{2} (6.055/sq mi)
  - Town: 666
  - Town density: 1,500/km^{2} (3,900/sq mi)
- Time zone: UTC-6 (Central Standard Time)
- Postal code: 49970
- Website: Santa María del Oro Municipality official government site

Santa María del Oro is a town and municipality, in the Southeastern Region of Jalisco, in central-western Mexico, being the least populous and most sparsely populated municipality in Jalisco. The municipality covers an area of 776.4 km^{2}.

As of 2020, the municipality had a total population of 1,815.

== History ==
Before the Conquest of Mexico (1519–1521), this region was inhabited by Purépecha or Tarascan indigenous people, who had been defeated in the Saltpeter War (1480–1510) (Guerra del Salitre). Later it became a ranch called La Teja, which belonged to Ramón Ochoa, originally from Quitupan. It was part of the indigenous ejido of Jilotlán.

In 1810, to the north of the town, the La Jarana sugarcane mill was in feverish activity, which stopped working during the Mexican War of Independence. Both the previous mill and the Real de Oro mining center belonged to some Spaniards who lived in Cotija, Michoacán. These sources of work gave life to the region. There were more than twenty mines in operation and in the Real de Oro, which had blast furnaces, silver and gold minerals were processed. The machinery was powered by the water that came from a dam that is located metres above. The gold and silver bars they obtained were continuously transported in large caravans to Mexico City. Such important sources of work had a bad end. The Spaniards resisted with the aid of royalist forces, the attacks of the insurgency, until 1812, the year in which any defense became impossible and then they decided to take refuge in Cotija provisionally, but later they were surprised and beheaded in Santa María del Oro. At the beginning of the 20th century, some Americans resumed work on the Real del Oro. Now, only ruins remain.

On 23 November 1883, the small town was elevated to vicariate of the Real del Oro de Huilamba, later being called Santa María del Oro.

It received the name of Manuel M. Diéguez when the municipality was erected on 6 January 1939 in memory of the revolutionary and state governor Manuel M. Diéguez, according to Decree number 4465.

By Decree number 16475 of the State Congress it was authorized the change of name of the municipality of Manuel M. Diéguez to Santa María del Oro. This provision was authorized on 20 December 1996 and was published in the Official Newspaper El Estado de Jalisco (The State of Jalisco), on 4 February 1997, to enter into force the following day.

By Decree number 17837 of the State Congress, published on 10 April 1999, the name of the municipality of Manuel M. Diéguez was changed to that of Santa María del Oro, Jalisco.

The region abounds with yacatas, mounds of earth or little "pyramids". They were built by excavating wells, approximately 4 metres in diameter, which were filled with large river stones and form a mound on the surface.

=== Timeline ===
- 1480–1510. This region was the theater of the Saltpeter War.
- 1523. Spaniard Alonso de Ávalos conquered the peoples of this region.
- 1812. Insurgent forces under the command of Francisco Guzmán surprised and beheaded 42 Spaniards in the town of Santa María del Oro.
- 1889, 1 October. The town of Santa María de Guadalupe became a political commissaryship subject to Jilotlán de los Dolores.
- 1938, 28 December. The decree that created the municipality of Manuel M. Diéguez was approved.
- 1997, 4 February. The decree that changed the name of the municipality of Manuel M. Diéguez to Santa María del Oro was published.
- 1999. 10 April. The decree that changed the name of the municipality of Manuel M. Diéguez to that of Santa María del Oro was published.

== Geography ==
=== Location ===
Santa María del Oro is located in the southeastern part of Jalisco between the geographic coordinates 19° 24' 15" and 19° 42' 30" North latitude, and 102° 32' 10" and 103° 03' 30" West longitude, at an altitude of 3182 feet (970 meters) above sea level.

The municipality borders to the north with the municipalities of Valle de Juárez and Quitupan, and the state of Michoacán; to the east with the state of Michoacán; to the south with the municipality of Jilotlán de los Dolores; and to the west with the municipality of Tamazula de Gordiano.

=== Topography ===
Its surface is made up of rugged areas (39%), with heights ranging from 3281 to 5413 feet asl (1000 to 1,650 m). Some of the hills located in the municipality are the following: El Burro, El Cantón, El Candelero, Cerro Alto, Los Truncos, and Del Sombrero, as well as a ravine named Barranca de Milpillas; there are also semi-flat areas (23%) and flat areas (38%).

==== Soils ====
The territory is made up of land belonging to the Quaternary period. The composition of the soils is of predominant types chromic and eutric cambisol, added in some part with haplic feozem, and in other higher parts the lithosol is located. The municipality has a land area of 104,400 acres (42,249 hectares), of which 25,452 (10,300) are used for agricultural purposes, 30,606 (12,386) for livestock activities, 43,708 (17,688) are for forest use, and 35 acres (14 hectares) are urban land, the use of 4,599 (1,861) not being specified. As far as property is concerned, an extension of 83,613 acres (33,837 hectares) is private and another of 15,694 (6,351) is ejidal; there is no communal property. The type of property for 5,093 acres (2,061 hectares) has not been specified.

=== Hydrography ===
The hydrological resources are provided by the rivers: Itzícuaro, Canela, Oro, Hornos, Plátanos, Agostadero, and Horcones. The streams are: Los Bordones, Calaquio, Los Toros, La Chimenea, La Preñada, Barranca del Alnaco, Barranca del Llano, Juan Pablo, La Huerta, and El Granadillo. In addition to having three hot water springs.

=== Climate ===
The climate is semi-dry, with dry autumn, winter and spring, and warm, without well-defined winter thermal changes. The average annual temperature is 75 °F (24 °C), with a maximum of 88.5 °F (31.4 °C) and a minimum of 62 °F (16.6 °C). The rainfall regime is during July and August, with an average rainfall of 1,075.1 millimeters. The prevailing winds are from the southwest.

=== Flora and fauna ===
Its vegetation is made up of wooded areas where species such as oak, ash tree and cold tropical species and a wide variety of fruit trees are located.

There are opossums, badgers, foxes, rabbits, coyotes, deers, pumas, and skunks, existing a great variety of birds.

== Economy ==
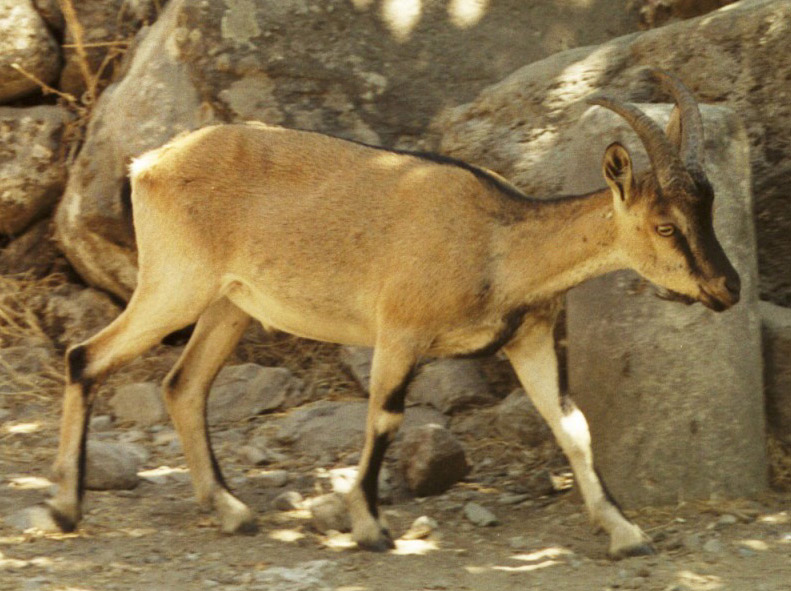
A goat.

Livestock: cattle, sheep, horses, goats, and pigs are raised. In addition to poultry and beehives. Agriculture: corn, sorghum, and agave stand out. Commerce: establishments dedicated to the sale of basic necessities and mixed shops that sell various items predominate. Services: professional, technical, community, personal and maintenance services are provided. Industry: the main industrial activity is the manufacture of cheese. Mining: there are deposits of gold, silver, and copper. Forest exploitation: oak and ash tree are exploited.

== Tourism ==
=== Architecture ===
- Old church
- Church ruins

=== Handcrafts ===
- Umbrellas (colloquially called "chinas") made of palm leaves

=== Parks and reserves ===
- El Encarnizado
- La Mesa del Valle
- Mesa de las Águilas
- Las Bufas
- Llanos de Zipoco

=== Rivers and dams ===
- Pihuamo River
- La Estancia Dam
- El Rio del Oro

=== Feasts ===
Religious feasts

- The Guadalupana. 12 December

== Government ==
=== Municipal presidents ===
Municipal president	Term	Political party	Notes
Hermila Vargas de Farías	01-01-1983–31-12-1985	PRI	
Arturo Facundo Ramírez	01-01-1986–31-12-1988	PRI	
Ángel Zamorano Chavarín	01-01-1989–1992	PRI	
Audón Sánchez Ochoa	1992–1995	PRI	
Jesús Mendoza Valencia	1995–1997	PAN	
Luis Sandoval García	01-01-1998–31-12-2000	PAN	
Fernando Farías Carranza	01-01-2001–31-12-2003	PAN	
Odocio Sandoval García	01-01-2004–31-12-2006	PAN	
Audel Ochoa Pérez	01-01-2007–31-12-2009	PAN	
Rafael López Núñez	01-01-2010–30-09-2012	PRI; Panal	Coalition "Alliance for Jalisco"
María Araceli Espinoza González	01-10-2012–30-09-2015	PRI; PVEM	Coalition "Compromise for Jalisco"
Eleazar Medina Chávez	01-10-2015–30-09-2018	PRI	
Guadalupe Sandoval Farías	01-10-2018–30-09-2021	PRI	
Guadalupe Sandoval Farías	01-10-2021–	PRI	Was reelected on 6 June 2021
