= Alberto Esquer Gutiérrez =

Mexican politician (born 1978)

- Born: 7 November 1978 (age 47); Zapotlán el Grande, Jalisco, Mexico
- Occupation: Politician
- Political party: PAN (1990s–2014); MC (2014–present)

Alberto Esquer Gutiérrez (born 7 November 1978) is a Mexican politician. As of 2025, he belongs to the Citizens' Movement (MC) but was formerly affiliated with the National Action Party (PAN).

Esquer Gutiérrez, a native of Zapotlán el Grande, Jalisco, has been elected to the Chamber of Deputies for Jalisco's 19th district on two occasions: in the 2009 mid-terms (61st Congress) for the PAN, and in the 2018 general election (64th Congress) for MC.

He sought election as one of Jalisco's senators in the 2024 Senate election, occupying the first place on the Citizens' Movement's two-name formula. The formula placed third with 27.3% of the vote and Esquer Gutiérrez was not elected.
