= Lázaro Arias Martínez =

Mexican politician (born 1957)

- Born: 17 December 1957 (age 68); Tamazula de Gordiano, Jalisco, Mexico
- Occupation: Politician
- Political party: PRI
- Family: Jesus Arias Martinez, brother

Lázaro Arias Martínez (born 17 December 1957) is a Mexican politician affiliated with the Institutional Revolutionary Party (PRI). In the 2003 mid-terms, he was elected to the Chamber of Deputies to represent Jalisco's 19th district during the 59th session of Congress.
