= Salvador Barajas del Toro =

Mexican politician (born 1972)

- Born: 8 May 1972 (age 54); Tamazula de Gordiano, Jalisco, Mexico
- Occupation: Politician
- Political party: PRI

Salvador Barajas del Toro (born 8 May 1972) is a Mexican politician affiliated with the Institutional Revolutionary Party (PRI).

Barajas del Toro, a native of Tamazula de Gordiano, Jalisco, has been elected to the Chamber of Deputies for Jalisco's 19th district on two occasions: in the 2006 general election (60th Congress), and in the 2012 general election (62nd Congress).
