= La Garita, Jalisco =

La Garita La Garita de San Lázaro
- Delegacion and Town
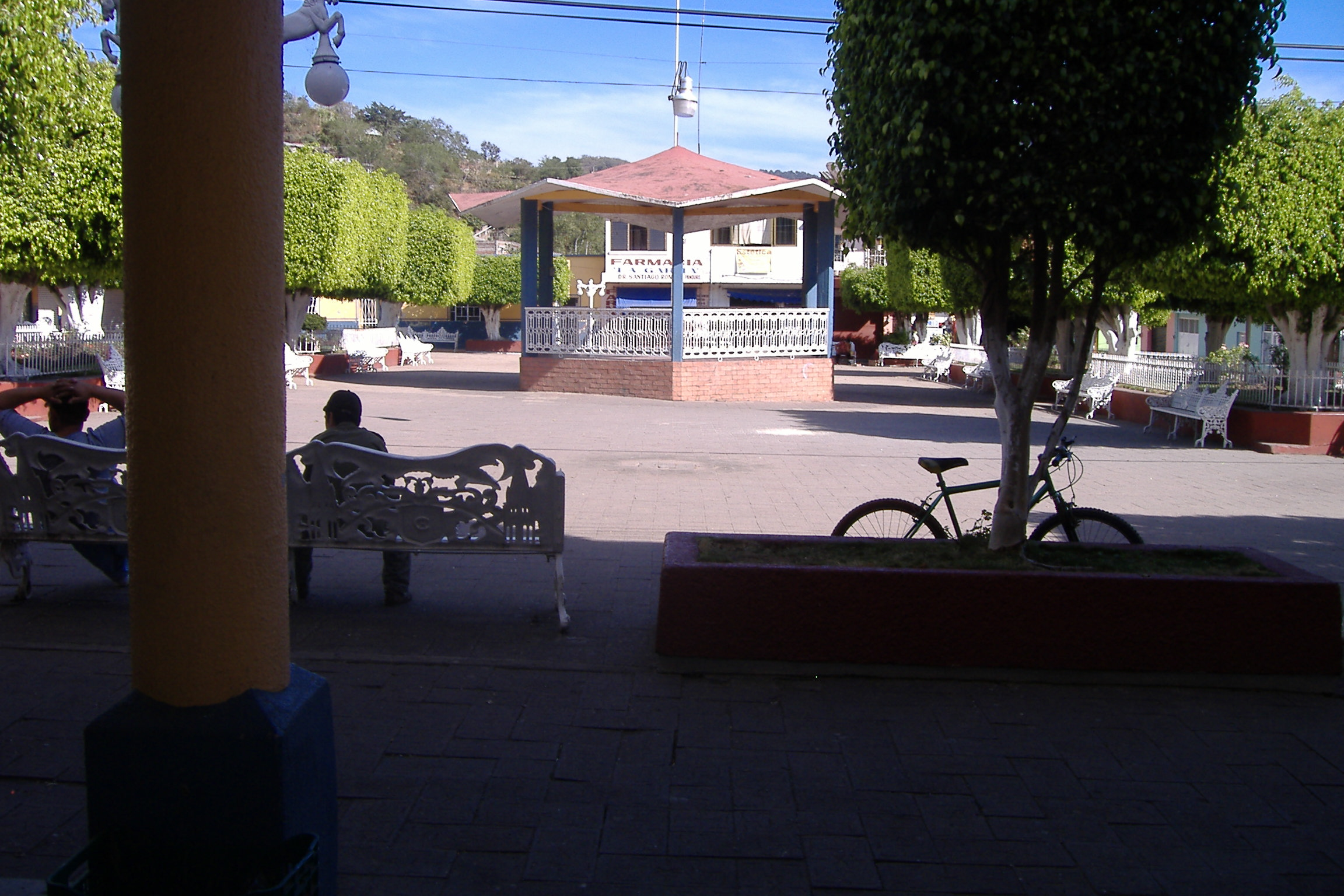
- Downtown Plaza

- Coat of arms
- Etymology: San Lázaro
- Mottoes: ~*~Pueblo Alegre~*~ Joyful Town
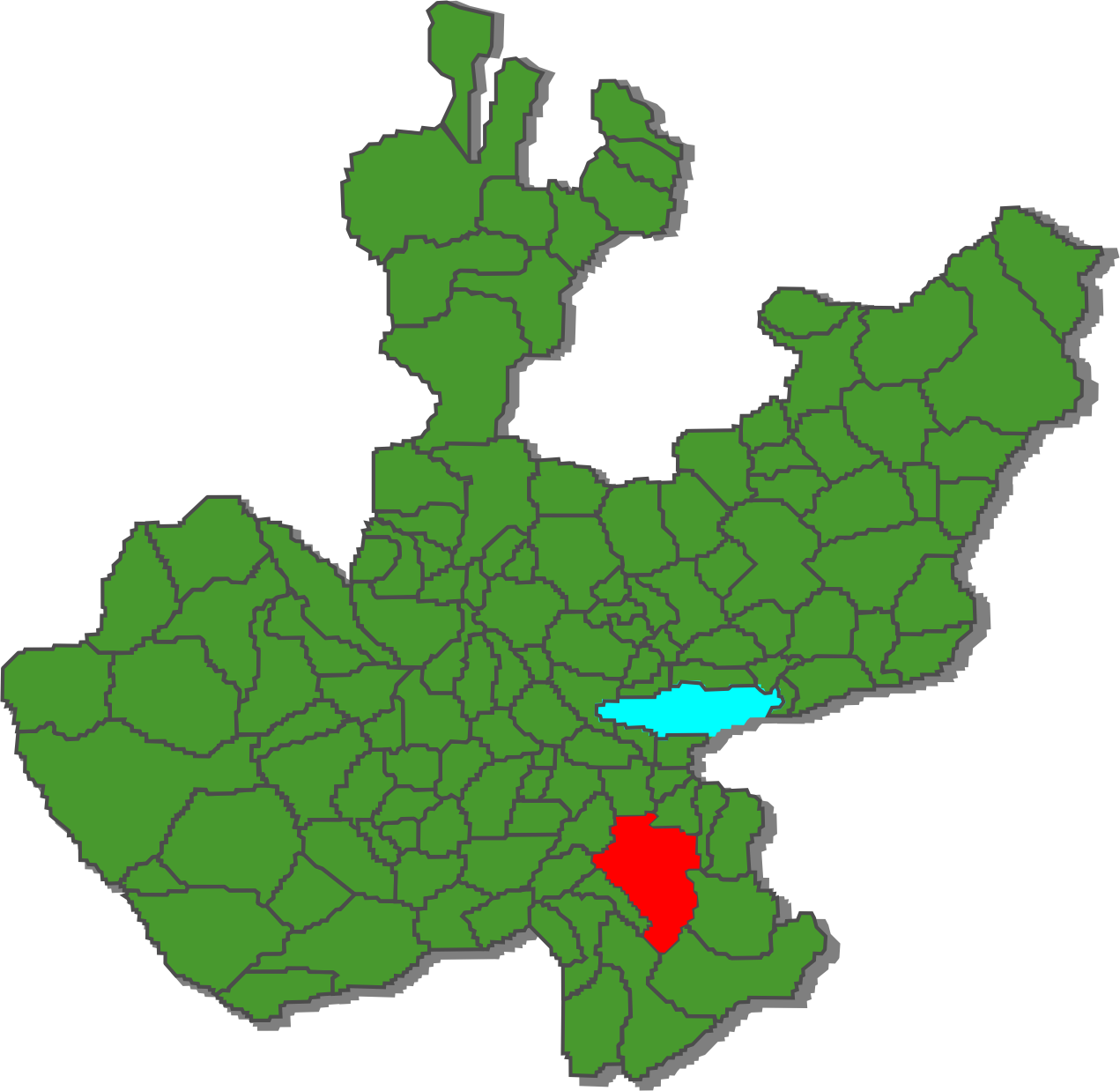
- Location of the municipality in Jalisco

- Location in Mexico
- Coordinates: 19°46′N 103°07′W
- Country: Mexico
- State: Jalisco
- Municipalities of Jalisco: Tamazula de Gordiano

Government
  - Delegado: Maria Isabel Martinez Magaña
- Elevation: 1,229 m (4,032 ft)

Population (2010)
  - Total: 1,060
- Demonym: Gariteños
- Time zone: UTC-6 (Central Standard Time)
  - Summer (DST): UTC-5 (Central Daylight Time)
- Postal Code: 49667
- Area code: 358
- Website: LaGaritaJalisco.com

La Garita is a town in the Mexican state of Jalisco in the Municipality of Tamazula de Gordiano. According to INEGI 2010 national census it pegged the town's population at 1,060 people. A special census done by the INEGI government agency estimated the population to be at 1,278 in 2005. Although this number seems low, about 1,000 people from La Garita now reside in the United States with the most living in California, Illinois, Texas, Florida, and New York. The city of Joliet, Illinois now is the destination for most of the emigrants from this town. Others have migrated to nearby cities like Tamazula de Gordiano, Ciudad Guzman, and Guadalajara.

== History ==
La Garita was called the property or Hacienda of San Lázaro when it was settled by rich businessmen. San Lázaro or Saint Lazarus was the patron of the settlement. The hacienda was founded around 1846 (the date that is referenced by the eldest citizens). During those times merchants that journeyed from the state of Michoacán to their destination, the state of Colima, stopped to rest in this area and to promote commerce in the region. Transportation during those times for merchandise was difficult and long for they only used animals to carry the loads. The merchants took this place as a refuge to rest and later continue their trip. It is one of the reasons why they called it "La Garita": "garita" comes from the old French "garita", which means refuge, of Germanic origin. People from different places settled in this place, including foreigners who constructed properties in the region, among them the one of La Garita that in that time, the landowners were those who had in their power the land and control of the region.

In the time of president 'Lazaro Cardenas' the federal government transformed the region into "ejidal" form or communal land, granting to the farmers the land that had belonged to the landowners for farming and settling. In 1940 the construction of the state highway Jiquilpan-Manzanillo 110 started, which crosses through the middle of the town of La Garita and connects with the town of Mazamitla and the city of Tamazula de Gordiano in the state of Jalisco. The highest ended the relative isolation of NB the town. The name was changed from "Hacienda de San Lázaro" to "La Garita de San Lázaro." Over the years the people dropped the patron's name and left only the name "La Garita." In 1946, to La Garita, a "Delegación" was granted to the town having its own civil registry and a police group.

== Demographics ==
Special Census of 2010

Town	Total Population	Number of Men	Number of Women	Occupied Dwellings
La Garita	1,060	483	577	285

== Geography ==
La Garita rests on the bank of the Tamazula river which is formed in La Garita from the union of the Creek of La Cuesta and the Sierra del Tigre river. The town varies in elevation due to the steepness of the hills and mountains of the area around the river bank. Part or almost half of the town sits on the valley created by the river over thousands of years ago while the other sits on the hills that make up the area of South-central Jalisco.

This part of the state of Jalisco sits on the Sierra Madre Occidental and the Sierra del Tigre, two major forest regions of Mexico. Its proximity to the high northern mountains of the state, Lake Chapala (the largest lake in Mexico), El Volcán de Colima (a major and still active volcano is south-central Mexico) and the ocean make for a unique geography.

=== Neighborhoods ===
The town of La Garita is divided into two sections by the national Mexican highway 110 creating the upper and lower neighborhoods. As the names say, the upper neighborhood is on a higher level on a hill that leads to the town of El Manchado. The lower neighborhood is actually in the valley below the highway created by the river, El Rio Tamazula. In the center of the town a plaza was built in honor of the town's residents who donated time and money for a centralized location for town gatherings and celebrations. After the creation of the town plaza, a new central neighborhood was created known as the heart of the town with most restaurants and shops located around the plaza.

Although the residents know the town as having three neighborhoods (upper, central, and lower), the town is actually divided into smaller sections of those neighborhoods called "barrios." The barrios were created by the church of the town that needed the division to allow the different barrios to host the symbol of the "feria," the virgin of the Tabernacle or "Virgen de Sagrario." All of the different neighborhoods or barrios are named after a religious Catholic symbol or saint.

Here is a list of the different barrios created by the church:

- Barrio de San Judas Tadeo
- Barrio de la Virgen de Guadalupe
- Barrio de Santa Maria Goretti
- Barrio del Sagrado Corazón de Jesús
- Barrio de Juan Pablo II
- Barrio de San Rodrigo Aguilar
- Barrio de la Sagrada Familia
- Barrio de San Antonio
- Barrio de la Virgen del Sagrario
- Barrio de San Jose

== Climate ==
The climate of La Garita, Jalisco is normally warm throughout the year. When summer begins is usually when the wet rainy season begins in the region, meaning that rainy days are more frequent than sunny days. The environment and its people have grown accustomed to a dry year with a very wet early summer. The rains are very beneficial to the sugarcane crops which make up most of the crops of the region. Most of the rains are caused by the influx of moisture from the Pacific Ocean in the form of low pressures, tropical storms, or at times hurricanes.

During the remainder of the year, a sunny, warm and very pleasant tropical climate makes up for the rest of summer and autumn. During the winter and spring is when the dry season begins, when rainy days are very limited.

== Transportation ==
Transportation for the town has always been a problem for the residents and visitors. There is no central hub for all travel, but since the major national highway 110 was constructed, which crosses through the center of the town, bus transportation between the state's major cities travel through the town of La Garita and stop here. The center of town has an area by the national highway where most taxis and buses stop. National buses also make a stop in town, but more towards the northeastern end part of the town near the town of La Verdura and closer to the eastern stream than the center of town on the side of the road. There is no train station or central transportation hub, but most visitors travel by means of their own car, bus, or taxi from nearby cities such as Tamazula and Mazamitla which do have a central hub for buses.

The nearby city of Tamazula de Gordiano recently finished construction (March 2012 H. Ayuntamiento 2010-2012) of a new central transportation hub for local, regional, and national buses at its main entryway, the Jose Maria Martinez Boulevard, which also finished its expansion to 3 and four lanes.

The nearest airports are Miguel Hidalgo International Airport (GDL) in Guadalajara, Jalisco (almost three hours away) and national airport of Colima in the City of Colima in the Mexican state of the same name, Colima, about two and a half hours away. Both of these airports offer bus service to the cities of Tamazula and Mazamitla, which may make a stop in the town of La Garita, if needed. The Miguel Hidalgo International Airport in Guadalajara is the airport of choice for the town's residents and visitors offering daily international flights to most major cities where most of the residents have family.

== Economy ==
La Garita has a varied economy similar to other tourism regions of Mexico. Most of the income generated by its citizens comes from the fields they own in the delegation of which it is one of the biggest sugarcane producers in the municipality. Sugarcane of varied types is grown and harvested to be taken to Ingenio Tamazula, S.A. de C.V. in the nearby city of Tamazula de Gordiano where it is converted into sugar. The waste products of the sugar process produce molasses and pure cane alcohol, which are also sold in the region. La Garita is also distinguished by entertainment venues, businesses, small shops, restaurants, pharmacies, and a waterpark.

The farmland is also used for corn, cattle, and swine. The hills surrounding the town create the perfect climate and irrigation for growing corn, alfalfa, and pasture. Farmers in the area that make a living from animals have: cows, pigs, chickens, goats, and sheep just to name a few. Although having livestock is not the most popular way to earn a living in La Garita, some prefer it instead of agriculture.

The rest of the citizens earn their income from the tourism generated from people that visit the town during its religious festivities, the nearby recently built river dam "El Carrizo," and the popular spa/sauna/waterpark of natural thermal waters "Las Jaras." Those citizens that don't work, and some that do, survive from the money that they receive from family members that now reside in the United States. Most of the town's migrate workers and residents now of the United States reside in the Chicago region and southern California region.

=== Tourism ===
The town is divided by the national highway Mexico 110 that runs from the city of Jiquilpan to the coastal port of Manzanillo. The corridor that parallels the highway that runs from the city of Tamazula de Gordiano to the mountain-city of Mazamitla make up the tourist region of the "Sierra del Tigre" or sierra of the tiger which focuses on eco-tourism, a form of tourism promoting nature. The town of La Garita just happens to be located in the middle of the corridor between both cities, and it is the start of the road that leads to the new river dam "El Carrizo" that has been converted into a tourist attraction for diving, boating, fishing, and more.

=== Cuisine ===
The town of La Garita is known for its Mexican cuisine:

- Birria de Chivo - marinated goat stew
- Sopitos - similar to a taco, a small corn tortilla fried in oil or lard, with mince meat, sauce, and cabbage
- Tostadas de Lomo - a large (dinner plate size) fried tortilla topped with mayonnaise or refried beans with fried pork loin, cabbage or lettuce, tomatoes, onions, grated cheese, and sauce
- Tacos de Cabeza - tacos made with steak from the head of the cow, cilantro, onions, and hot tomatillo sauce
- Tacos de Adobada (made with a special adobo also made in the town) - tacos made with marinated pork tenderloin, with cilantro, onions, and hot tomatillo sauce
- Enchiladas - tacos rolled in a corn tortilla topped with a spicy/sweet sauce, cabbage, and grated cheese
- Tortas de Lomo - A sandwich-type food made with a crispy dinner roll, with fried pork loin, lettuce, tomatoes, onions, cheese, mayonnaise, and hot jalapeño peppers if preferred.
- Tamales (Rojos, Verdes, Rajas, Queso) - Tamales are like corn cakes filled with either pork or beef in red or green hot sauce, cheese, or sliced peppers (the peppers vary by region).
- Carnitas - Fried pork that comes in many forms from stomach, intestines, maw, rinds or cracklings, and many other parts.

Those are some of its more popular foods, but when it comes to drinks:

- Freshed squeezed juices every morning (Carrots, beets, oranges, apples, celery).
- Chocolate milk with "rompope" (alcoholic eggnog), quail eggs, protein powder, cinnamon, and many more.
- Atole - made with flour, brown sugar (comes in sugar cones), milk, vanilla extract, and cinnamon.
- Tequila - of course it is the most popular Mexican alcoholic drink and it is very popular in La Garita.

== Landmarks ==
- La Parroquia de La Garita is a municipal landmark since its construction and named one of the most unusual churches in the state of Jalisco with its new modern Clock Tower.
- The Formal Hacienda of San Lázaro - Current home of the Gutierrez family is a landmark and one of the few remains of the Hacienda that founded the town of La Garita.

== Education ==
Elementary school of La Garita, Jalisco.

There are three public schools in La Garita ranging from Kindergarten to grade 9. All three schools are in the upper half of the town, built there in order to be safe from the frequent floods by the neighboring stream and river that used to flood the lower half of the town often in years past.

For Kindergarten a small Jardin de Niños is available for children starting at age 5.

As far as elementary education, an older school which educated the majority of the town citizens named Revolución was recently torn down to be replaced by a well needed three story building with modern amenities and computer labs. Unfortunately, the construction process of the building was not inspected properly resulting with the front entrance on the building towards the back, and vice versa. The elementary school hosts grades 1st through 6th (in Mexico elementary does not end on 5th grade as it is in the U.S., but 6th grade).

A Jr. High is also available in town, although farther from the heart of the town, it hosts grades 7th-9th. In Mexico this is known as the secundaria or secondary education school.

== Health care ==
IMSS clinic of La Garita, Jalisco.

La Garita currently has a clinic by the Instituto Mexicano del Seguro Social (IMSS), a social security clinic funded by the workers of the region, especially the farmers of the sugarcane fields in the area. This is not an open clinic, only those people who qualify for the social security either by their work or a family member who works and pays for their social security is able to get medical aid, medicines, and care.

== Religion ==
Parroquia de La Garita, Jalisco.

Religion is a big part of the culture and habits of the citizens of La Garita. There is one church in the town, La Parroquia de La Garita. The town celebrates all saints and the virgin of Guadalupe as most of Mexico, but every town has a special celebration or fair, "la feria", to the town's Patron, San Lázaro. Up to recently, the celebration for the patron was revived as it was forgotten with time and the popularity of the virgin to the municipality of Tamazula, la Virgen del Sagrario.

Each of the fairs have a specific number of days for the celebration with different things done in honor of the patron or virgin on each day plus entertainment. The popularity of each brings tourists and visitors to the town increasing the entertainment value from concerts with the best bands, mariachi bands, and pop stars that Mexico has to offer. The celebration of the "Virgen del Sagrario" is done from 20 November to 30 November each year. For the town's patron, "San Lázaro", it begins on 17 to 22 December each year.

About 89% of the citizens of La Garita consider themselves Catholics, while there are 11% which either do not associate with a specific religion or are other Christians. The number of Christians is growing each year and sits at about 5% that is composed of Baptist, Pentecostal, and Jehovah's witness.

== Sports ==
Soccer is the main sport in the town with its popular team La Garita on the Municipal League, fast becoming a contender on the league with a Juveniles and Intermedias versus teams.

The rodeo and bull riding is also a popular sport in the town although it is mostly seen during the religious festivities such as the Feria de la Virgen de Sagrario.

Basketball has become a popular sport in the town with the basketball court in a new community park that also includes a new soccer field with audience stands or bleachers, a concert stage and more, right by the river.
