= Frank Flores =

Frank Flores may refer to:

- Frank Flores (swimmer) (born 1969), Guamanian swimmer
- Frank Flores (football manager) (born 1984), Venezuelan football manager
- Frank Flores (triple jumper) (born 1929), American long and triple jumper, 1952 NCAA runner-up for the USC Trojans track and field team

== See also ==
- Francisco Flores (disambiguation)
