= Cessy Casanova =

Mexican comedian and singer

Cecilia Santiago (born circa 1969, Tecalitlan, Jalisco), better known as Cessy Casanova, is a Mexican comedian and singer. She has been doing comedy singing for over twenty years.

== Biography ==
Casanova is the daughter of former Vargas de Tecalitlán guitarron player Natividad Santiago, and the sister of the band's current guitarron player, Marco Antonio Santiago. Casanova began her comedy career in 1989. Casanova had always told jokes at school events, but her true passion was singing. Even though doing comedy wasn't her original plan, she eventually embraced her humor.

Casanova usually performs on stage wearing an evening gown. She bills herself as La Dama de la Comedia (The Dame of Comedy). As a singer, she can perform ballads as well as songs in the Latin and pop genres. She inserts humor into her singing.

Cessy currently lives in Mexico, D.F.

== Discography ==
- Hazme Tuya
- Entre Sabanas
