= Francisco Flores =

Francisco Flores may refer to:

- Francisco Flores del Campo (1907–1993), Chilean musician and actor
- Francisco Flores (footballer, born 1926) (1926–1986), Mexican football midfielder
- Francisco Flores Pérez (1959–2016), president of El Salvador
- Francisco Flores (wrestling) (fl. 1960–1970s), Mexican wrestling promoter
- Francisco Javier Flores Chávez (born 1966), Mexican politician
- Francisco Flores (footballer, born 1988), Nicaraguan football left-back
- Francisco Flores (Venezuelan footballer) (born 1990), Venezuelan football defensive-midfielder
- Francisco Flores (footballer, born 1994), Mexican football right-back
- Francisco Flores (athlete), Honduran track and field athlete in 1993 World Championships in Athletics – Men's 400 metres
- Francisco Flores (Argentine footballer) (born 2002), Argentine football centre-back
