= Atoyac, Jalisco =

Atoyac
- Municipality
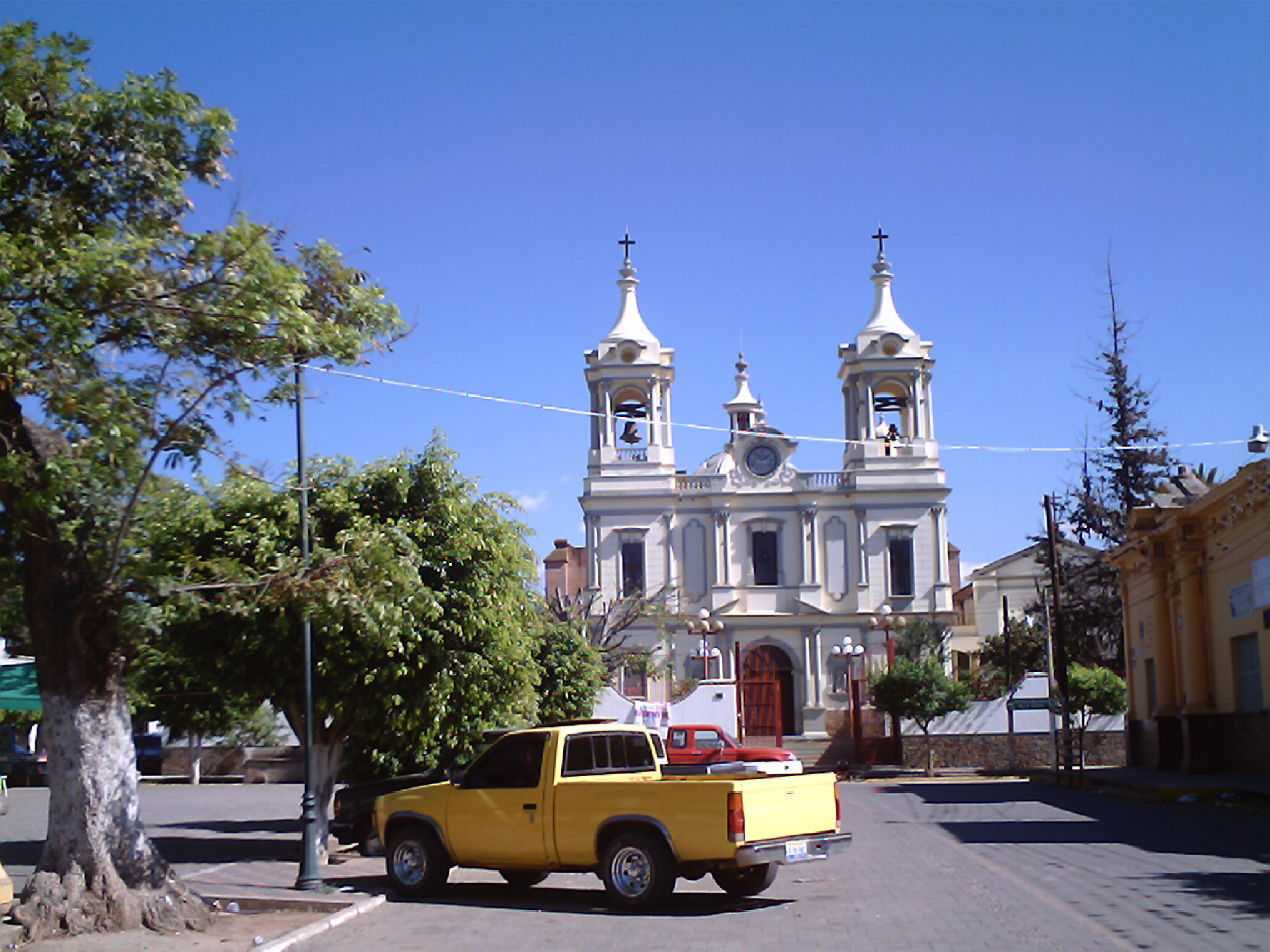

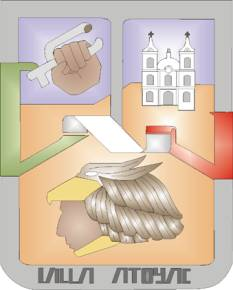
- Coat of arms

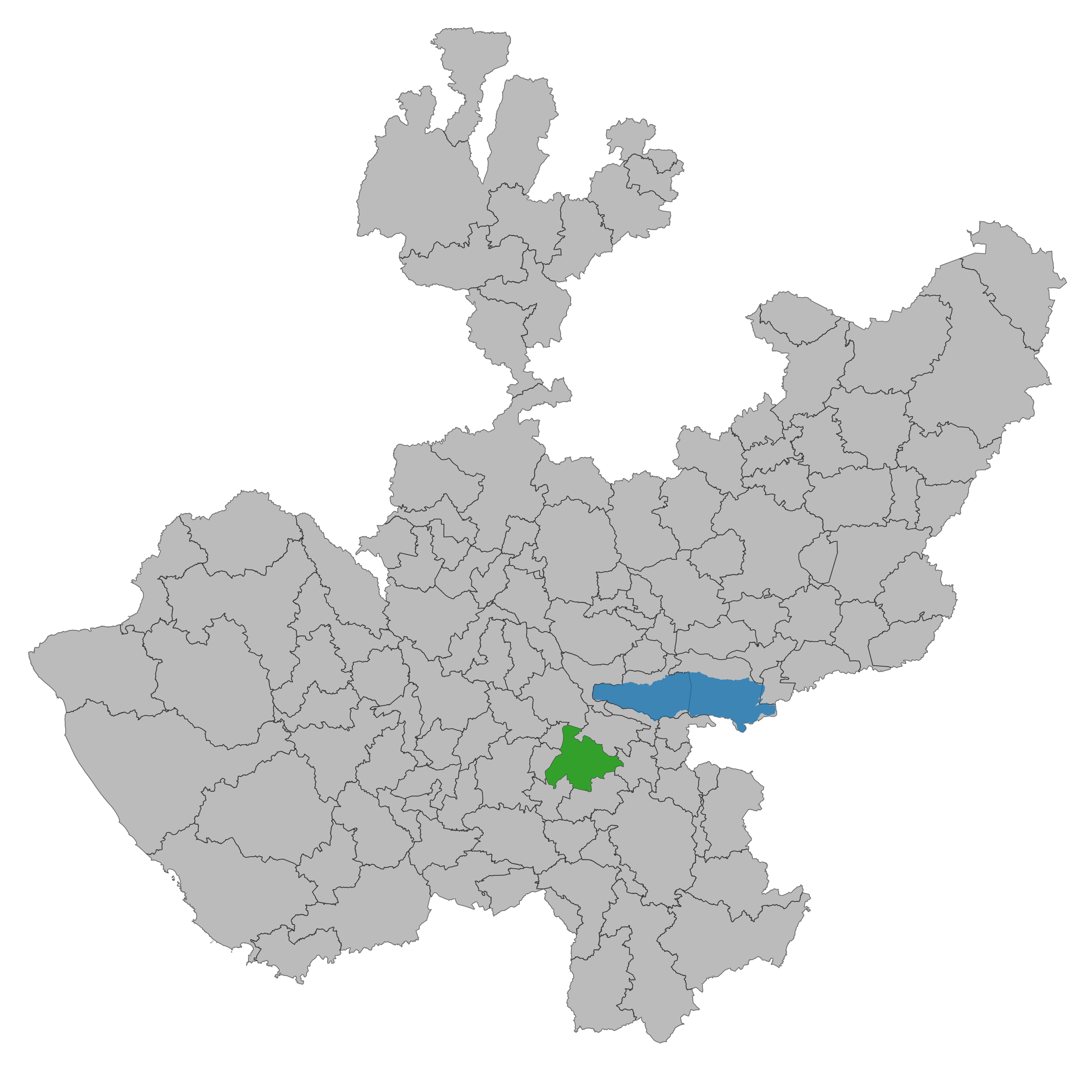
- Municipality of Atoyac in Jalisco

- Location in Mexico
- Coordinates: 19°52′20″N 103°20′40″W
- Country: Mexico
- State: Jalisco

Area
  - Total: 451.5 km^{2} (174.3 sq mi)
  - Town: 2.37 km^{2} (0.92 sq mi)

Population (2020 census)
  - Total: 8,689
  - Density: 19.24/km^{2} (49.84/sq mi)
  - Town: 5,389
  - Town density: 2,270/km^{2} (5,890/sq mi)
- Time zone: UTC-6 (Central (US Central))

Atoyac Municipality is a municipality in the Mexican state of Jalisco. The administrative centre for the municipality is located in the town of Atoyac, Jalisco.

== Name ==
Its name derives from the Nahuatl Atoya-k, which means to "Place near the river".

About 36,000 years ago this region was covered by the waters that formed an immense lake.

== Geography ==
The municipality of Atoyac is located in the southern region of the state of Jalisco, between coordinates 19°52'20" to 20°07'35" North and 103°20'40" to 103°36'05" West, at a height of 1,350 meters above sea level.

It limits the north with the municipality of Zacoalco de Torres and Teocuitatlán de Corona, the south with Sayula and Gómez Farías; to the east with Teocuitatlán de Corona and Concepción de Buenos Aires and to the west with Amacueca and Techaluta de Montenegro.

The municipal territory of Atoyac has a surface of 235.81 km^{2}. Festivities - Atoyac, as many towns in Mexico, is part of an annual festivity in which a saint (El Senor the de la Salud) is celebrated. According to an ancient myth, the town of Atoyac suffered a devastating epidemic that killed several residents. It was not until the saint was brought down from its post and paraded around the town that the epidemic allegedly stopped. In celebration of this miracle, the saint is parade every year following the same route it did the first time.

=== Climate ===
Climate data for Atoyac (1991–2020 normals, extremes 1943–present)
Month	Jan	Feb	Mar	Apr	May	Jun	Jul	Aug	Sep	Oct	Nov	Dec	Year
Record high °C (°F)	38 (100)	36 (97)	39 (102)	39.5 (103.1)	40 (104)	40.5 (104.9)	39 (102)	36.5 (97.7)	34.5 (94.1)	38 (100)	37 (99)	34.5 (94.1)	40.5 (104.9)
Mean daily maximum °C (°F)	28.5 (83.3)	30.4 (86.7)	32.4 (90.3)	34.3 (93.7)	35.1 (95.2)	32.6 (90.7)	29.6 (85.3)	29.4 (84.9)	29.0 (84.2)	29.7 (85.5)	29.5 (85.1)	28.5 (83.3)	30.8 (87.4)
Daily mean °C (°F)	18.3 (64.9)	19.7 (67.5)	21.3 (70.3)	23.1 (73.6)	24.7 (76.5)	24.6 (76.3)	23.0 (73.4)	22.8 (73.0)	22.6 (72.7)	22.2 (72.0)	20.4 (68.7)	18.6 (65.5)	21.8 (71.2)
Mean daily minimum °C (°F)	8.0 (46.4)	9.0 (48.2)	10.3 (50.5)	12.0 (53.6)	14.3 (57.7)	16.7 (62.1)	16.3 (61.3)	16.2 (61.2)	16.2 (61.2)	14.6 (58.3)	11.2 (52.2)	8.7 (47.7)	12.8 (55.0)
Record low °C (°F)	0.5 (32.9)	0.5 (32.9)	2.5 (36.5)	5.4 (41.7)	7 (45)	10 (50)	6 (43)	10.5 (50.9)	7.5 (45.5)	5 (41)	2.5 (36.5)	1 (34)	0.5 (32.9)
Average precipitation mm (inches)	19.4 (0.76)	11.6 (0.46)	7.2 (0.28)	2.5 (0.10)	33.5 (1.32)	107.5 (4.23)	130.7 (5.15)	130.9 (5.15)	105.7 (4.16)	54.9 (2.16)	10.2 (0.40)	9.7 (0.38)	623.8 (24.56)
Average precipitation days	1.7	1.3	1.1	0.9	4.2	12.9	17.7	17.0	14.4	6.9	1.9	1.6	81.6
Source: Servicio Meteorológico Nacional (Mexico)
