= Francisco Javier Flores Chávez =

Mexican politician (born 1966)

- Born: 19 February 1966 (age 60); Jalisco, Mexico
- Occupation: Politician
- Political party: PAN

Francisco Javier Flores Chávez (born 19 February 1966) is a Mexican politician from the National Action Party (PAN). In the 2000 general election, he was elected to the Chamber of Deputies to represent Jalisco's 19th district during the 58th session of Congress.
