= Tecalitlán =

Coordinates: 19°28′N 103°18′W

- Municipality and town
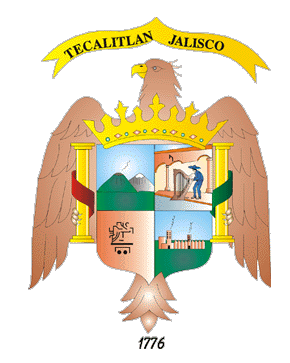
- Coat of arms

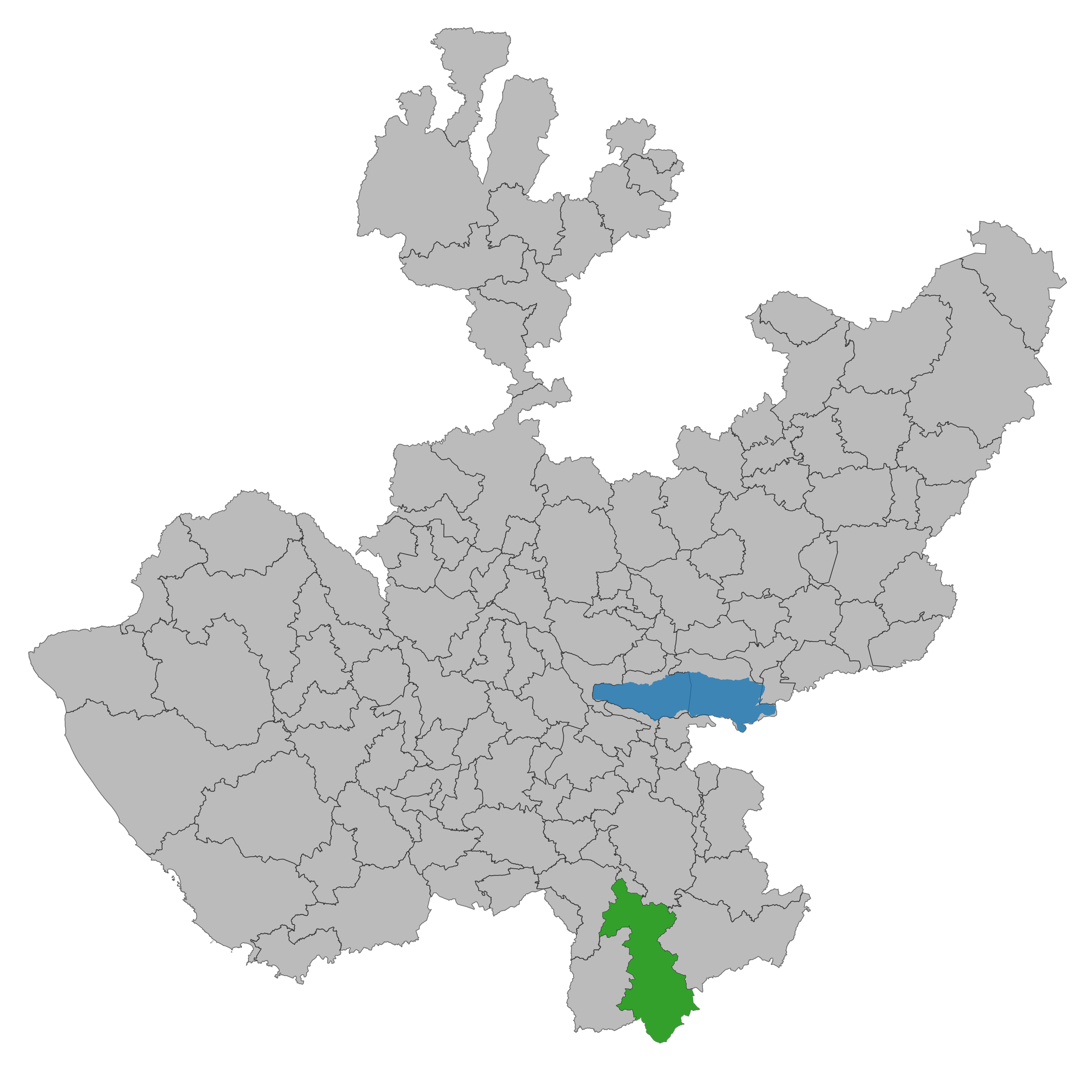
- Location of the city in Jalisco

- Location in Mexico
- Country: Mexico
- State: Jalisco

Area
  - Total: 1,301 km^{2} (502 sq mi)
  - Town: 3.66 km^{2} (1.41 sq mi)

Population (2020 Census)
  - Total: 16,705
  - Density: 12.84/km^{2} (33.26/sq mi)
  - Town: 13,243
  - Town density: 3,620/km^{2} (9,370/sq mi)
- Time zone: UTC-6 (Central Standard Time)

Tecalitlán is a town and municipality in the central Pacific coastal state of Jalisco, Mexico, being the southernmost municipality in Jalisco. Located just south of Ciudad Guzmán, the population of the municipality was 16,705 as of 2020.

== Economy ==
=== Industry ===
One of Tecalitlán's major industries was sugar cane, which ended about thirty years ago. Nowadays, the economy relies on agriculture, such as the rearing of cattle, pigs, chickens, and goats. Many Tecalitlán families rely on relatives who immigrated to the United States to send money back.

== Culture ==
Tecalitlán is at the heart of the region where mariachi music was developed, and in fact the most famous exponent of that genre, Vargas de Tecalitlán, was founded there in the 1890s (though now resident in Mexico City). There is a museum of this mariachi in Tecalitlán. Tecalitlán has many traditions, such as the fiestas de diciembre which celebrates religion and the love toward the Virgin of Guadalupe.

People in this town can be friendly, while some aren't.

A post-mass Sunday tradition that remains involves people heading to the town center (Jardin) to spend their afternoon socializing. In Jardin, girls walk one way, boys the other way, on the sidewalk around the park, so they can face each other and check each other out. Culturally, girls do not stare directly at the boys, but lock arms with each other and chat as they walk. Street vendors sell hollowed out egg shells filled with confetti which maybe to cracked over the head of someone they admire passing the opposite way. It's a special experience and honor, as it shows who is admired, while they continue to walk and are seen by everyone. The parents and older folks sit on the benches along the sidewalk and chat, enjoying watching the young people interact in a safe environment.

There is the cerro de la cruz, a mountain were there is a cross that people go to visit and offer sacrifices.

A local culinary specialty is birria, a savory stew made from goat meat and other ingredients. There are also other foods like tacos, sopes, pozole, tostadas, enchiladas and many more Mexican traditional foods.

Comedian/singer Cessy Casanova, whose father and brother have been guitarron players with Vargas de Tecalitlán, was born and raised here.

== Gang violence ==
On December 11, 2010, a gun battle between rival gangs killed 11 people during a Virgin of Guadalupe celebration. Armed men arrived in three cars and opened fire on another group of gunmen in the main plaza of Tecalitlán.

In January 2018, three Italian businessmen were abducted by a group of corrupted police officers linked with a local gang. The Italian men, originating from Naples, are suspected by Mexican prosecutors of having been part of a ring selling fake-brand power generators. The reason for their visit to Mexico is unclear. In relation to the disappearance of the three Italians, one of the leaders of the Jalisco New Generation Cartel, José Guadalupe Rodríguez Castillo known as 'El 15', was captured by the Federal Prosecution Office in July 2018. It remains unclear what happened to the Italians.

On July 2, 2018, the mayor of Tecalitlán, Víctor Díaz Contreras, was shot to death by an unidentified group of vigilantes when traveling in his car in the town part Emiliano Zapata. A municipal employee who was accompanying the mayor was injured. Víctor Díaz Contreras was a member of the then-ruling Institutional Revolutionary Party and one of the youngest mayors in the state.
