= Pihuamo =

- Municipality and town
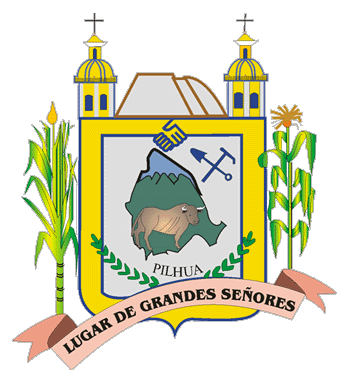
- Coat of arms

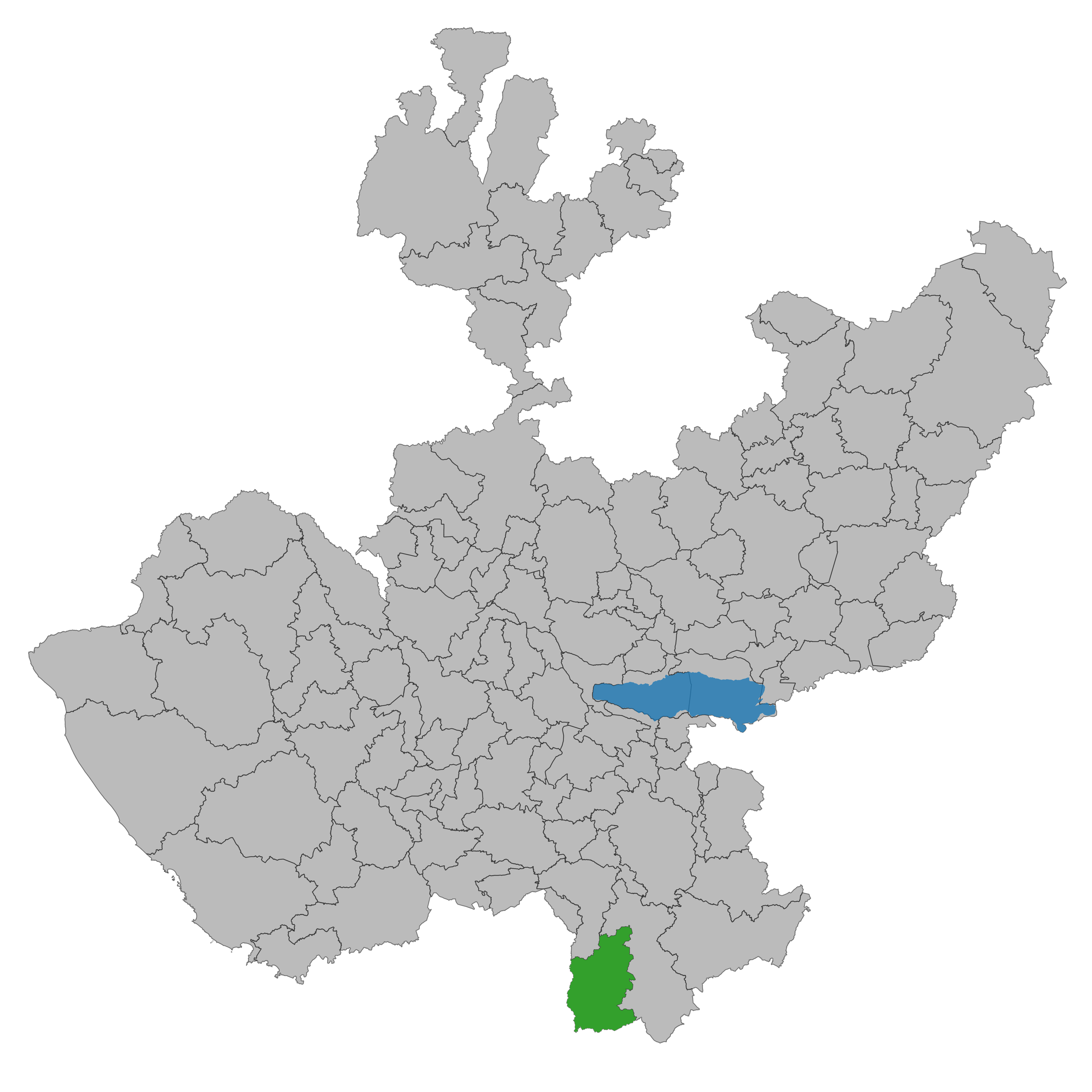
- Location of the municipality in Jalisco

- Location in Mexico
- Coordinates: 18°57′N 103°10′W
- Country: Mexico
- State: Jalisco

Area
  - Total: 874.6 km^{2} (337.7 sq mi)
  - Town: 3.38 km^{2} (1.31 sq mi)

Population (2020 census)
  - Total: 11,386
  - Density: 13.02/km^{2} (33.72/sq mi)
  - Town: 6,668
  - Town density: 1,970/km^{2} (5,110/sq mi)
- Time zone: UTC-6 (Central Standard Time)

Pihuamo is a town and municipality located in the state of Jalisco in Mexico.

== History ==
Pihuamo is a municipality located in the southeast region of the state of Jalisco. At one time this region belonged to another town in Jalisco known as Tzapotlán. The occupants of this town have had various origins: toltecas, zapotecas and purépechas. The purépechas arrived to that region in 1480, and they dominated the town of Tzapotlán for some years, but before the Spanish conquest they were defeated by the indigenous of Zapotlán, Zacoalco, Sayula, and Colima in the Saltpeter War (1480-1510) (Guerra del Salitre).

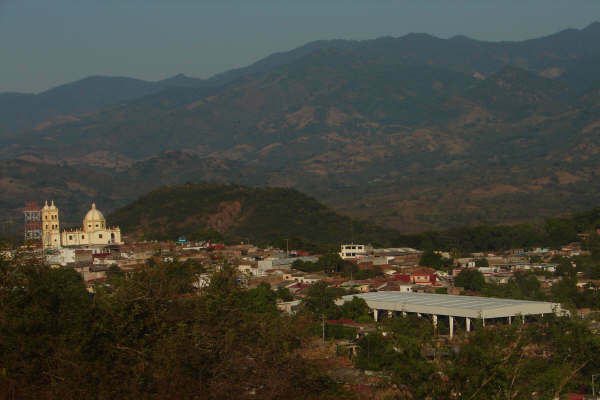
Pihuamo

This territory was discovered and conquered by the Captain Cristóbal de Olid with the aid of Juan Rodríguez de Villafuerte in early 1522 when they were sent there by Hernán Cortés to explore the western region of what is today known as Jalisco. In 1598 the town of Santiago of Pivámoc was on the bank of a river, in a valley between the high hills. It was inhabited by seven married aborigines. They spoke the Mexican language and the popoloca language. They lived in Tuxpan. Xilollancini was a little town that was in a deep valley; however Xilollancini was destroyed by a heavy rain that lasted various hours and it divided La Cajita hill. Today, this town is called Pueblo Viejo. This incident caused Xilollancini to be changed from its old location to its current location called Las Lomas. This place belonged to a man named Pío, who his workers called "owner", and with the time these 2 words were converted into the current name of this town: Pihuamo. During Mexico's Independence from Spain 1810–1821, the parroquial files were burned. Antonio Cañas escaped because frequently, in the church, he gave the orders to the insurgent movement. In 1825 he was in the town hall because at that time the town was controlled by the army, the "4º Cantón de Sayula" and in 1890 the town was controlled by other army, the name of that army was the "9º Cantón de Ciudad Guzmán". In the development of Pihuamo, there isn't information about the history of this municipality between 1825 and 1890. In April 1891 this place became a municipality, and the territorial limits were established. This was under the 472 decree on 29 April of the sale year. The 7341 decree published on 27 January 1959 granted the title of "Villa". In Pihuamo, Dr. Atl presented the chimerical city of the Universal Culture with the name of "Olinka". Olinka is a náhuatl word and it means place where movement is generated. The objective of Olinka was that artists and intellectual people could live there.

== Government ==
=== Municipal presidents ===
Municipal president	Term	Political party	Notes
Ignacio Castellanos	1908–1910		
Manuel Mora Urzúa	1910		
Gabriel de la Mora	1910		
Anastacio Carrillo Orozco	1911		
J. Trinidad L. Fernández	1911		
Catarino Ceballos	1912		
Leopoldo Magaña	1912		
Florencio Amezcua	1912		
Longinos Nuño	1913		
J. Luz E. Ceballos	1913		
Sóstenes Carrillo	1913		
Gabriel de la Mora	1913		
Leopoldo Magaña	1914–1917		
Juan Ceballos	1918		
Francisco Chávez	1918		
Manuel Oliveros	1918		
José Ochoa Amezcua	1919		
Margarito O. Casillas	1919		
José Encarnación Ochoa	1919		
Teodoro Gutiérrez	1919		
Telésforo Reyes	1919		
José Ochoa Amezcua	1919		
Gabriel de la Mora	1919		
Teodoro Gutiérrez	1920		
José de Jesús Ceballos	1920		
Leopoldo Magaña	1921		
Juan Ceballos	1921		
J. Luis Gutiérrez	1921		
Leopoldo Magaña	1921–1922		
Teodoro Gutiérrez	1922		
Anastacio Carrillo Orozco	1923		
Pedro de la Mora	1924		
J. Jesús Gutiérrez	1924		
José Ma. Ceballos	1924		
Leopoldo M. Álvarez	1924		
Nemesio Valencia	1924–1925		
José Ma. Ceballos	1925		
José de Jesús Gutiérrez	1925		
N/A	1926		
Heliodoro Ruvalcaba	1927		
J. Encarnación Arellano	1927		
Ramón Vergara	1928		
Fidencio Vergara	1928		
Ramón Vergara	1929		
Donaciano Cárdenas	1929	PNR	
Juan G. Rodríguez	1930	PNR	
Luciano Ceballos	1931	PNR	
Ramón Vergara	1932	PNR	
Nemesio Valencia	1933	PNR	
Fidencio Vergara	1933	PNR	
J. Encarnación Ochoa Arellano	1933	PNR	
J. Miguel Quintero	1933	PNR	
Jacobo Godínez	1934	PNR	
Emiliano Ochoa	1935–1936	PNR	
Heliodoro Ceballos Pérez	1937	PNR	
Luciano Ceballos Luna	1938	PNR	
Antonio Ramos Ramírez	1938	PRM	
José Ma. Ceballos	1939	PRM	
Macario Mora Barajas	1940	PRM	
Daniel Estrada	1941	PRM	
Eusebio Llamas	1942	PRM	
Ángel Ramírez Barón	1943	PRM	
Salvador Arellano	1944	PRM	
Luis Amezcua Zárate	1945–1946	PRM	
Severiano Casillas Ochoa	1947	PRI	
Ramón Vergara Anguiano	1948	PRI	
Cristóbal Lepe S.	1949	PRI	
Manuel Sánchez Araujo	1950–1952	PRI	
Severiano Casillas Ochoa	1953–1955	PRI	
Simón Gálvez Larios	1956–1958	PRI	
Luis Amezcua Zárate	1959–1961	PRI	
Florencio Amezcua Martínez	1961	PRI	Acting municipal president
Luis Amezcua Zárate	1961	PRI	Acting municipal president
Abel Bautista Peña	01-01-1962–31-12-1964	PRI	
Ismael Ortiz Ochoa	01-01-1965–31-12-1967	PRI	
Raúl Mejía Valencia	01-01-1968–31-12-1970	PRI	
Abel Bautista Peña	01-01-1971–31-12-1973	PRI	
Humberto Amezcua Bautista	01-01-1974–31-12-1976	PRI	
Pedro Flores Verduzco	01-01-1977–31-12-1979	PRI	
Mercedes Chavira L.	01-01-1980–31-12-1982	PRI	
Raúl Mejía Valencia	01-01-1983–31-12-1985	PDM	
Gonzalo Rodríguez Hinojosa	01-01-1986–31-12-1988	PRI	
Eduardo Ramírez Jiménez	01-01-1989–1992	PRI	
Alfredo Casillas Mendoza	1992–1995	PRI	
Jesús Cuevas Morfín	1995–1997	PRI	
Mario Héctor González Flores	01-01-1998–31-12-2000	PRI	
Jesús Solórzano Castellanos	01-01-2001–31-12-2003	Convergencia Democrática (CD)	
Felipe de Jesús Mayoral Landín	01-01-2004–31-12-2006	PRI	
Mario Héctor González Flores	01-01-2007–31-12-2009	PRI	
Felipe de Jesús Mayoral Landín	01-01-2010–30-09-2012	PRI; Panal	Coalition "Alliance for Jalisco"
Everardo Contreras López	01-10-2012–30-09-2015	PT; MC	Coalition "Progressive Alliance for Jalisco"
María Elizabeth Alcaraz Virgen	01-10-2015–31-03-2018	MC	She applied for a temporary leave, to run backed by the "Front for Mexico" (PAN-PRD-MC) towards the deputation of the local electoral district 19 of Jalisco, which she got
Abel Larios Jiménez	01-04-2018–2018	MC	Acting municipal president
Juan Alcaraz Virgen	01-10-2018–05-03-2021	PT; Morena; PES	Coalition "Together We Will Make History"
Humberto Amezcua Bautista	01-10-2021–28-02-2024	PRI	Applied for a leave in order to seek reelection. Was murdered on the night of 15 March 2024 in downtown Pihuamo
Mario Ceballos Córdova	01-03-2024–	PRI	Acting municipal president
