= Quitupan =

- Municipality and town
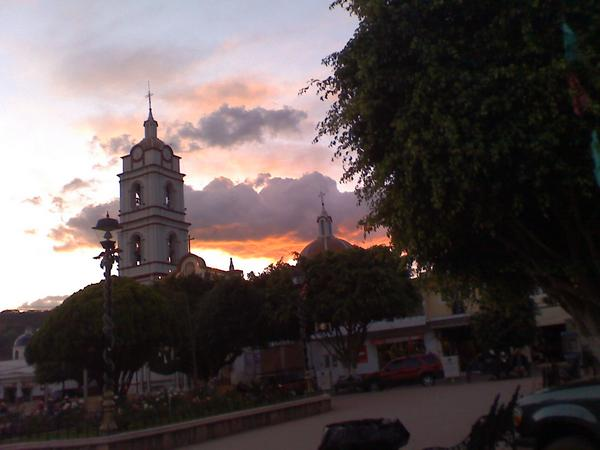

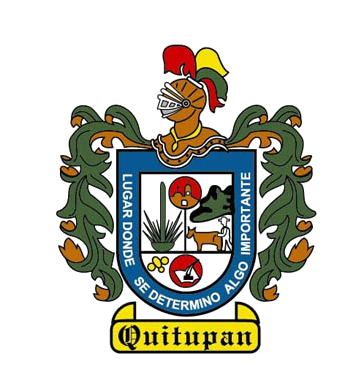
- Coat of arms

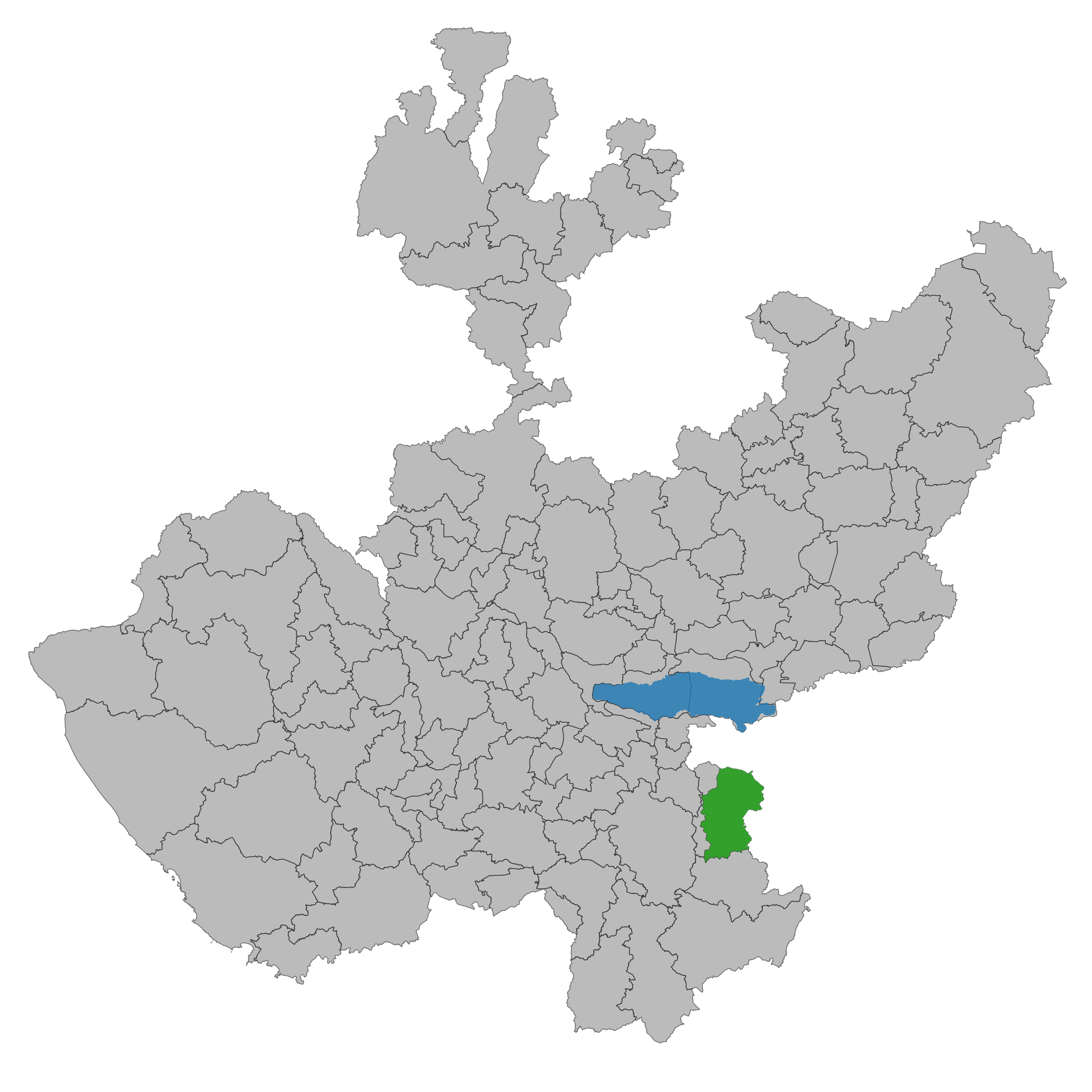
- Location of the municipality in Jalisco

- Location in Mexico
- Coordinates: 19°39′N 102°45′W
- Country: Mexico
- State: Jalisco

Area
  - Total: 674.3 km^{2} (260.3 sq mi)
  - Town: 1.23 km^{2} (0.47 sq mi)

Population (2020 census)
  - Total: 7,734
  - Density: 11.47/km^{2} (29.71/sq mi)
  - Town: 1,466
  - Town density: 1,190/km^{2} (3,090/sq mi)
- Time zone: UTC-6 (Central Standard Time)

Quitupan is a town and municipality located in the southeastern region of the Mexican state of Jalisco. The name Quitupan comes from the word "Quitoa" or "Quitla", which means "place where declarations or treaties come from" or "place that is located above".

== History ==
The formal indigenous foundation of the town precisely coincides with the establishment of a peace treaty between tarascos (Purépechas) and aboriginals, which occurred ten years before the arrival of the conqueror Hernán Cortés. A census taken in 1580 noted 30 integrated families.

The town was conquered by Alonso de Avalos, who nevertheless recognized the chieftainship of the original inhabitants. In 1522, Cortés dispatched one of his generals, Cristóbal de Olid to conquer Quitupan and surrounding areas. In 1530, Nuño Beltrán de Guzmán arrived to conduct a census of the native inhabitants and to impose a new order. The Evangelization of Quitupan was led by the Franciscans – in 1530, Friar Martin de Jesus began to preach, joined in 1532 by Friars Juan de Padilla and Miguel de Bologna. Viceroy Antonio de Mendoza then visited the area, under his appointment by King Charles I of Spain to pacify the various indigenous people of New Spain and to unify the territory, which was partially divided among competing conquistadors.

During the second half of the century, the region was beset by various armed confrontations between conservatives and liberals. Other historical landmarks include the Franciscan Intervention, the revolution of 1920 and the Guerra Cristera. On October 28, 1870 Quitupan was official recognized as a municipality of the state of Jalisco. Its first president was Francisco Lorenzo Gonzalez.

== Geography ==
Quitupan is located in the southeast region of the state of Jalisco. The Northern latitudes measures 19° 39' 20" to 19° 58' 10", the Western longitude measures 102° 45' to 103° 01'. It is 1,593 meters above sea level.

More than half of its surface (55%) is composed of rugged mountainous terrain, with altitudes reaching to 2,100 meters above sea level. 25% the land forms part of the mountain range known as Mazamitla. Foothills cover another quarter of the surface (25%) with altitudes ranging from 1650 to 1800 meters. The rest of it surface (20%) are plains that measure in altitude of 1550 to 1650 meters.

=== Climate ===
The climate is semi-arid. Winters and springs are dry and semi warm with little temperature change. The annual average temperature is 19 °C with a maximum of 26.71 °C. The rainy season begins in June and lasts until August with average precipitation of 807.3 millimeters.

Climate data for Quitupan (1991–2020 normals, extremes 1946–present)
Month	Jan	Feb	Mar	Apr	May	Jun	Jul	Aug	Sep	Oct	Nov	Dec	Year
Record high °C (°F)	35 (95)	35 (95)	39 (102)	39.5 (103.1)	39.5 (103.1)	39 (102)	38 (100)	37 (99)	37 (99)	36 (97)	36 (97)	39 (102)	39.5 (103.1)
Mean daily maximum °C (°F)	26.6 (79.9)	28.2 (82.8)	30.2 (86.4)	32.5 (90.5)	33.5 (92.3)	31.3 (88.3)	29.6 (85.3)	29.2 (84.6)	28.5 (83.3)	28.6 (83.5)	28.1 (82.6)	26.9 (80.4)	29.4 (84.9)
Daily mean °C (°F)	16.0 (60.8)	17.7 (63.9)	19.7 (67.5)	21.8 (71.2)	23.3 (73.9)	23.3 (73.9)	22.3 (72.1)	22.0 (71.6)	21.4 (70.5)	20.7 (69.3)	18.8 (65.8)	16.4 (61.5)	20.3 (68.5)
Mean daily minimum °C (°F)	5.3 (41.5)	7.1 (44.8)	9.2 (48.6)	11.0 (51.8)	13.1 (55.6)	15.3 (59.5)	15.0 (59.0)	14.7 (58.5)	14.4 (57.9)	12.7 (54.9)	9.4 (48.9)	5.8 (42.4)	11.1 (52.0)
Record low °C (°F)	−1 (30)	−1.5 (29.3)	1.5 (34.7)	4 (39)	1.5 (34.7)	9 (48)	9.5 (49.1)	9 (48)	7 (45)	0.8 (33.4)	1 (34)	−1 (30)	−1.5 (29.3)
Average precipitation mm (inches)	20.7 (0.81)	18.6 (0.73)	15.6 (0.61)	4.2 (0.17)	38.1 (1.50)	148.0 (5.83)	176.8 (6.96)	136.0 (5.35)	123.0 (4.84)	75.1 (2.96)	19.8 (0.78)	8.3 (0.33)	784.2 (30.87)
Average precipitation days	1.6	1.4	1.6	0.6	5.4	14.9	19.0	17.7	15.0	7.6	2.5	0.6	87.9
Source: Servicio Meteorológico Nacional

=== Lakes and lagoons ===
The Guadalupe lagoon is also known as El Quiringual because three quarters of the lagoon is in inhabited by the town Quiringual. Nonetheless, the town El Quiringual has approximately 50 people living in it.
