= Saltpeter War (Mexico) =

Mesosmerican Conflict (1480-1510)

Salitre War
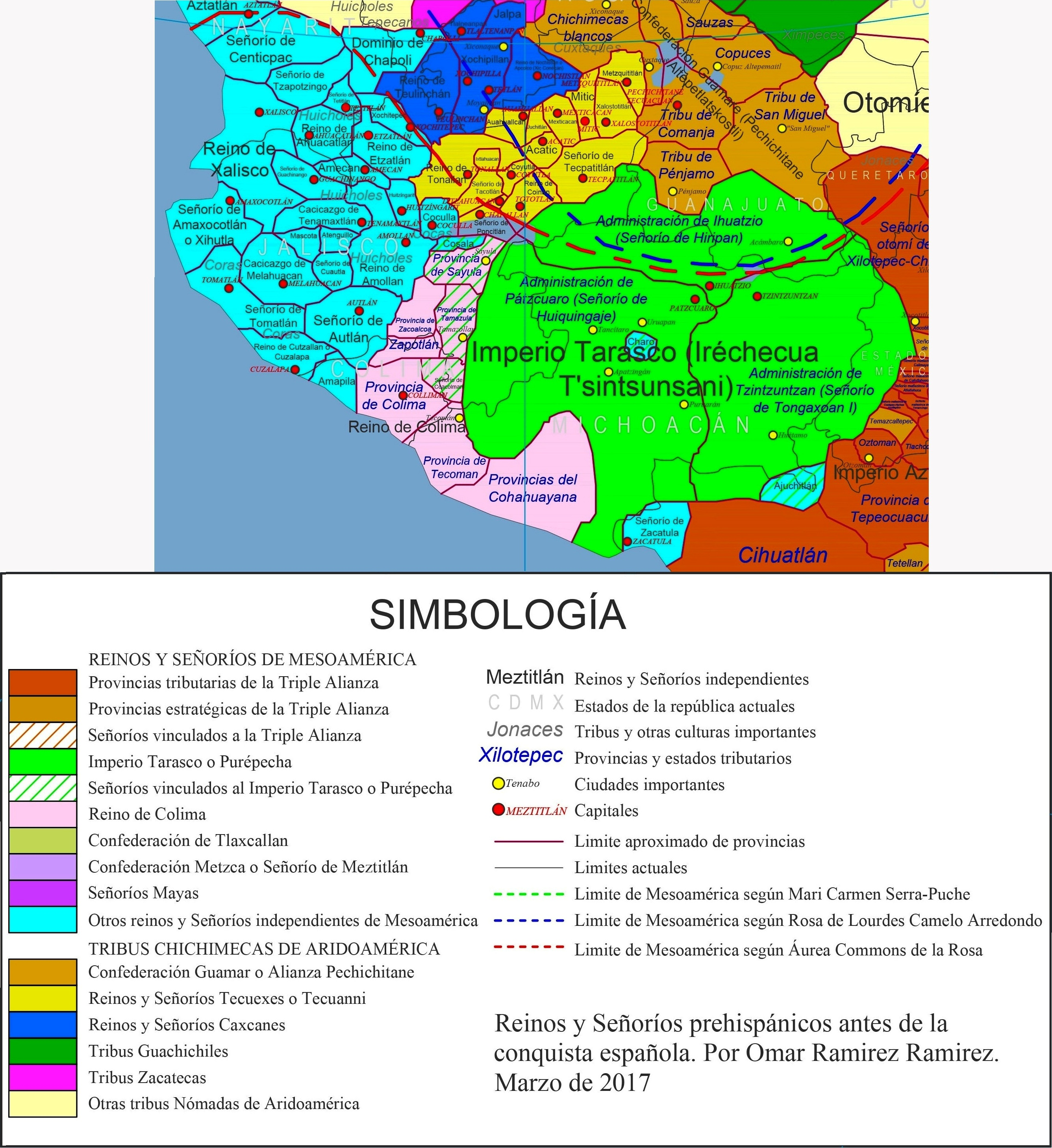
Date	1480–1510
Location	Mesoamerica (present-day Mexico)
Result	Expulsion of the Purépecha Empire from Colima and Jalisco

Belligerents
Purépecha Empire	Colima Sayula Zapotlán Tapalpa Autlán

Commanders and leaders
Tangaxuan II	

The Salitre War (Spanish: Guerra del Salitre; also Saltpeter War) was a 1480-1510 military conflict between the Purépecha Empire of the Purépecha people and peoples settled in Colima, Sayula, Zapotlán, Tapalpa, and Autlán, particularly the Kingdom of Colima. It started with the invasion by Purépecha cazonci (monarch) with the purpose to seize the mining of saltpeter and ended with the expulsion of Purépecha from the areas of Colima and Jalisco.
