= Tarascan =

Name for the Purépecha culture

Tarascan or Tarasca is an exonym and the popular name for the Purépecha culture. It may refer to:

- the Tarascan State, a Mesoamerican empire until the Spanish conquest in the 1500s, located in (present-day) west-central Mexico
- the Purépecha people
- the Purépecha language

The term has pejorative connotations of "loathsomeness and disgust" when it refers to the people or their language.

== Etymology ==
The name "Tarascan" (and its Spanish-language equivalent, "tarasco") comes from the word "tarascue" in the Purépecha language, which means indistinctly "father-in-law" or "son-in-law". The Spanish took it as their name, for reasons that have been attributed to different, mostly legendary, stories.

The Nahuatl name for the Purépecha was "Michhuàquê" ("those who have fish"), whence the name of the Mexican state of Michoacán.
