= Jilotlán de los Dolores =

- Municipality and city
- Flag of Jalisco in Jilotlán

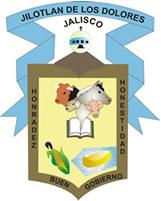
- Coat of arms

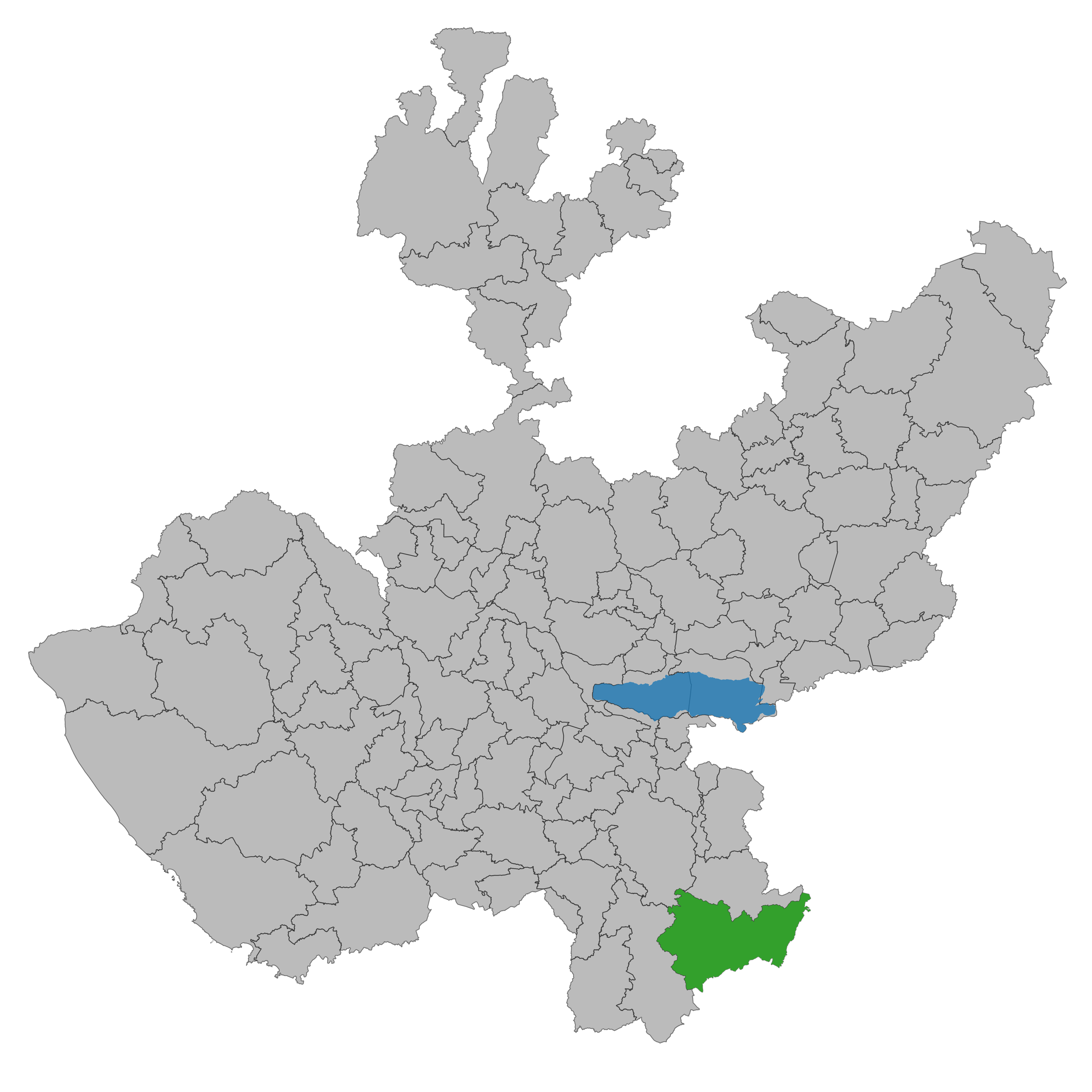
- Location of the municipality in Jalisco

- Location in Mexico
- Coordinates: 19°22′19″N 103°01′9.4″W
- Country: Mexico
- State: Jalisco

Area
  - Total: 1,511.78 km^{2} (583.70 sq mi)

Population (2005)
  - Total: 58,579
- Time zone: UTC-6 (Central Standard Time)

Jilotlán de los Dolores is a town and municipality, in Jalisco in central-western Mexico. The municipality covers an area of 1511.78 km^{2}.

As of 2005, the municipality had a total population of 8,579.

== Government ==
=== Municipal presidents ===
Term	Municipal president	Political party	Notes
1983–1985	Antonio Parvool Cisneros	PRI	
1986–1988	Urbicio L. Del Toro	PRI	
1989–1992	Salomón Garibay Ortega	PRI	
1992–1995	Emiliano Doñán Álvarez	PRI	
1995–1997	Jaime Soto Isaís	PRI	
1998–2000	Jesús Valencia Orozco	PAN	
2001–2003	Jesús García Torres	PAN	
2004–2006	Hermila Mendoza Mendoza	PRI	
01/01/2007–31/12/2009	Luis Manuel Godines González	PRI	
01/01/2010–30/09/2012	Hermila Mendoza Mendoza	PRI; Panal	"Alliance for Jalisco"
01/10/2012–30/09/2015	Carlos Enrique Llamas González	PRI; PVEM	
01/10/2015–27/03/2018	Juan Carlos Andrade Magaña	MC	Applied for a temporary leave, to run for reelection. Was assassinated on 15 April 2018
27/03/2018–30/09/2018	Saúl Alcaraz Cortez	MC	Acting municipal president
01/10/2018–30/09/2021	Ydalia Chávez Contreras	PAN; PRD; MC	
01/10/2021–01/10/2021	Ana Cristina Enríquez Cárdenas		President of the Acting Municipal Council. Appointed by the Congress of the State of Jalisco. She remained in office for only a few hours
01/10/2021–30/09/2024	Huber Ortega Padilla		Elected by the body of eleven alderpersons. President of the Acting Municipal Council
01/10/2024–	Hisel González Mendoza (woman)	PAN	
