= Gómez Farías, Jalisco =

Municipality in the State of Jalisco, Mexico

Coordinates: 19°48′N 103°29′W

Gómez Farías
- Municipality
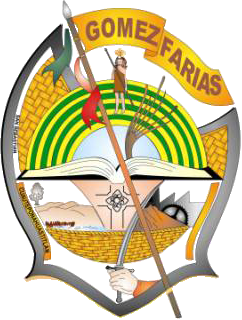
- Coat of arms

- Location in Jalisco Gómez Farías (Mexico)
- Country: Mexico
- State: Jalisco
- Demonym: (in Spanish)
- Time zone: UTC−6 (CST)

Gómez Farías is a municipality in Jalisco, Mexico.

== Largest settlements ==
- San Sebastián del Sur
- San Andrés Ixtlán
- El Rodeo
- Ejido Uno de Febrero
- Cofradía del Rosario
- El Corralito
- La Calavera
- Los Ocuares
- Jesús Aranda
- Cerrillos
- Ramón Núñez
- Ninguno
