= Ciudad Guzmán =

- City
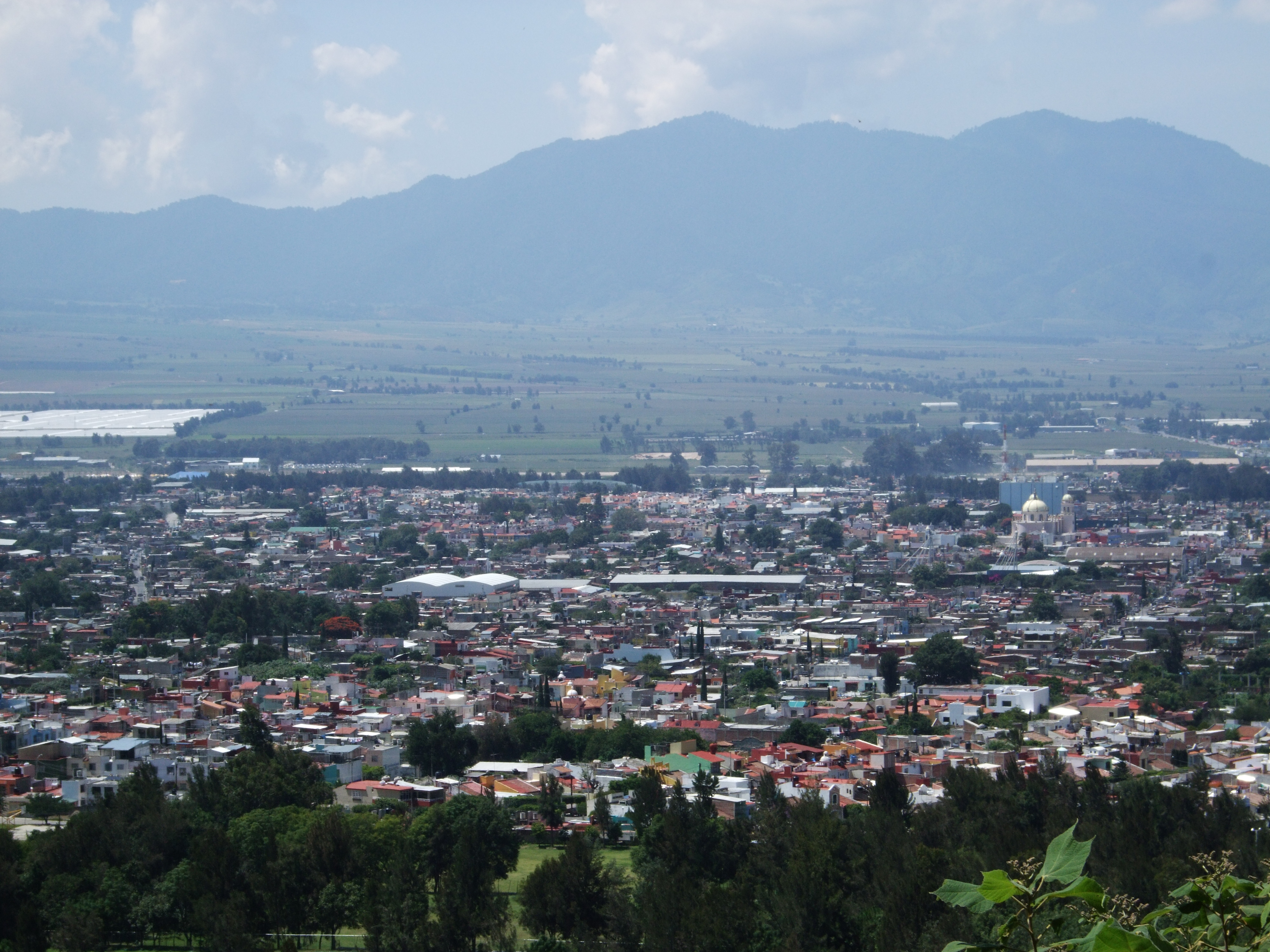
- View of Guzman from a nearby mountain

- Location in Mexico
- Coordinates: 19°42′N 103°28′W
- Country: Mexico
- State: Jalisco
- Municipality: Zapotlán el Grande

Government
  - Presidente Municipal: Pepe Guerrero

Area
  - City: 18.31 km^{2} (7.07 sq mi)

Population (2020 census)
  - City: 111,975
  - Density: 6,116/km^{2} (15,840/sq mi)
- Time zone: UTC-6 (Central Standard Time)
- Website: http://www.ciudadguzman.gob.mx

Ciudad Guzmán (also known as simply Guzmán) is a city in the Mexican state of Jalisco. It is located 124 kilometres (77 mi) south of Guadalajara, at a height of 1,507 metres (4,944 ft) above sea level. Its population totaled 97,750 in the 2010 census, ranking as the eighth-largest city in the state.

Ciudad Guzmán is the municipal seat of Zapotlán el Grande municipality, which has an area of 295.29 km^{2} (114.0 sq.mi). The municipality's population was 115,141 in the 2020 census.

== History ==
Prior to the arrival of the European Spanish Conquistadors, this area was part of the pre-Columbian kingdom of Zapotlán and was at different times under the domain of the nearby kingdoms of Colima and Michoacán.

Zapotlán el Grande was conquered in 1526. Many treasures and weapons are said to be buried throughout the town's old colonial homes, buildings, and farms.

In the mid-19th century, the name of the town was changed from Zapotlán el Grande to Ciudad Guzmán, after the Mexican federalist insurgent Gordiano de Guzmán.

The town has been nicknamed the "Athens of Jalisco" because it's the birthplace of several well-known intellectuals and artists, including the muralist José Clemente Orozco, the composer Consuelo Velázquez, the scientist José María Arreola and the journalist and historian Juan José Arreola.

The oldest part of the city, in the downtown area, holds a major stone Cathedral (Catedral de San José) that local folklore says is haunted. Ciudad Guzmán is located in an area of high seismic activity. The cathedral's towers have tumbled down several times due to earthquakes, sometimes killing people, and their souls are said to guard the place.

The last time the towers collapsed was on September 19, 1985, during the 1985 Mexico City earthquake, an earthquake of magnitude 8.1 that has come to be considered one of the most devastating natural disasters of the 20th century. In Guzmán City, it left more than 50 people dead and about 1,000 injured. The cathedral towers were never rebuilt to their majestic height.

== Geography ==
The city is located 124 kilometres (77 mi) south of Guadalajara, at a height of 1,507 metres (4,944 ft) above sea level.

=== Climate ===
Ciudad Guzman has a humid subtropical climate (Köppen climate classification Cwa) with distinct dry and wet seasons. The warmest month is June with an average of 23.0 °C (73.4 °F) and the coldest month is January with an average of 15.7 °C (60.3 °F). Average annual precipitation is 717.8 millimetres (28.3 in), most of it concentrated from June to September and during these months, thunderstorms and cloudy days are common and humidity is higher. In contrast, the dry season has little precipitation and cooler temperatures but the weather can be foggy, especially from October to January. Frosts can occasionally occur on the coldest nights but extended periods of frosts are rare. The record high was 39.0 °C (102.2 °F) on April and again on May 30, 1998 while the record low was −3.5 °C (25.7 °F) on January 12, 1997.

Climate data for Ciudad Guzman (1991-2020)
Month	Jan	Feb	Mar	Apr	May	Jun	Jul	Aug	Sep	Oct	Nov	Dec	Year
Record high °C (°F)	37.0 (98.6)	36.0 (96.8)	39.0 (102.2)	39.0 (102.2)	39.0 (102.2)	38.7 (101.7)	35.0 (95.0)	38.0 (100.4)	32.1 (89.8)	32.4 (90.3)	31.5 (88.7)	31.0 (87.8)	39.0 (102.2)
Mean daily maximum °C (°F)	25.6 (78.1)	27.7 (81.9)	30.1 (86.2)	32.1 (89.8)	33.0 (91.4)	30.5 (86.9)	28.8 (83.8)	28.5 (83.3)	27.9 (82.2)	27.9 (82.2)	26.8 (80.2)	25.6 (78.1)	28.7 (83.7)
Daily mean °C (°F)	16.1 (61.0)	17.4 (63.3)	19.0 (66.2)	20.9 (69.6)	22.9 (73.2)	23.3 (73.9)	22.1 (71.8)	22.0 (71.6)	21.8 (71.2)	20.9 (69.6)	18.4 (65.1)	16.4 (61.5)	20.1 (68.2)
Mean daily minimum °C (°F)	6.6 (43.9)	7.0 (44.6)	8.0 (46.4)	9.8 (49.6)	12.7 (54.9)	16.0 (60.8)	15.5 (59.9)	15.5 (59.9)	15.6 (60.1)	13.8 (56.8)	10.1 (50.2)	7.2 (45.0)	11.5 (52.7)
Record low °C (°F)	−3.5 (25.7)	−1.0 (30.2)	0.0 (32.0)	0.0 (32.0)	4.8 (40.6)	9.0 (48.2)	7.0 (44.6)	9.0 (48.2)	9.7 (49.5)	3.5 (38.3)	0.0 (32.0)	−1.0 (30.2)	−3.5 (25.7)
Average precipitation mm (inches)	28.2 (1.11)	10.8 (0.43)	10.9 (0.43)	2.0 (0.08)	26.5 (1.04)	117.3 (4.62)	145.3 (5.72)	160.3 (6.31)	152.9 (6.02)	76.6 (3.02)	23.5 (0.93)	8.1 (0.32)	762.4 (30.02)
Average precipitation days (≥ 0.1 mm)	2.4	1.3	1.1	0.6	4.4	15.6	19.4	21.1	17.5	9.9	3.1	1.5	97.9
Average relative humidity (%)	67.9	64.6	58.2	51.4	54.4	69.7	74.1	75.8	76.9	71.4	69.3	70.6	67.0
Mean monthly sunshine hours	234.1	255.0	289.5	279.1	250.2	231.2	159.7	188.7	183.0	225.5	246.5	230.6	2,773.1
Source 1: Servicio Meteorológico National
Source 2: NCEI, Colegio de Postgraduados (sun)

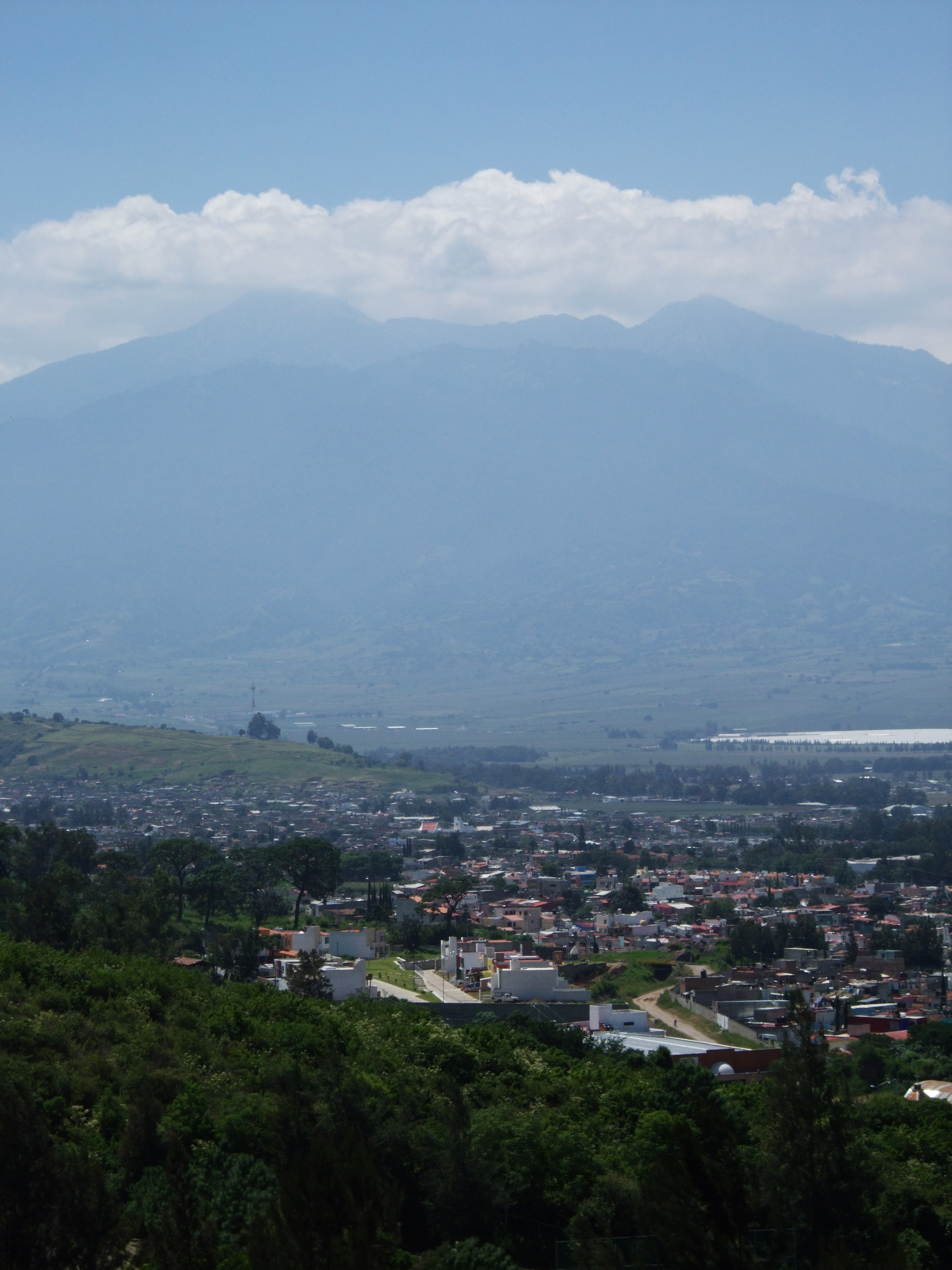
Volcano in Zapotlán El Grande

== Notable people ==
- Juan José Arreola, writer, academic, and actor.
- José Clemente Orozco, caricaturist and painter.
- Consuelo Velázquez, concert pianist and composer.
- Esmeralda Pimentel, actress and model.
- José Rolón, composer.
- Luis Chávez, footballer.
- Pedro Weber, actor and comedian

== Sister cities ==
Guzmán is a sister city of these municipalities:

- Longmont, Colorado, United States. Lake Havasu City, Arizona, United States.
