= Tamazula de Gordiano =

- Municipality and city
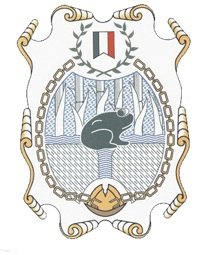
- Coat of arms

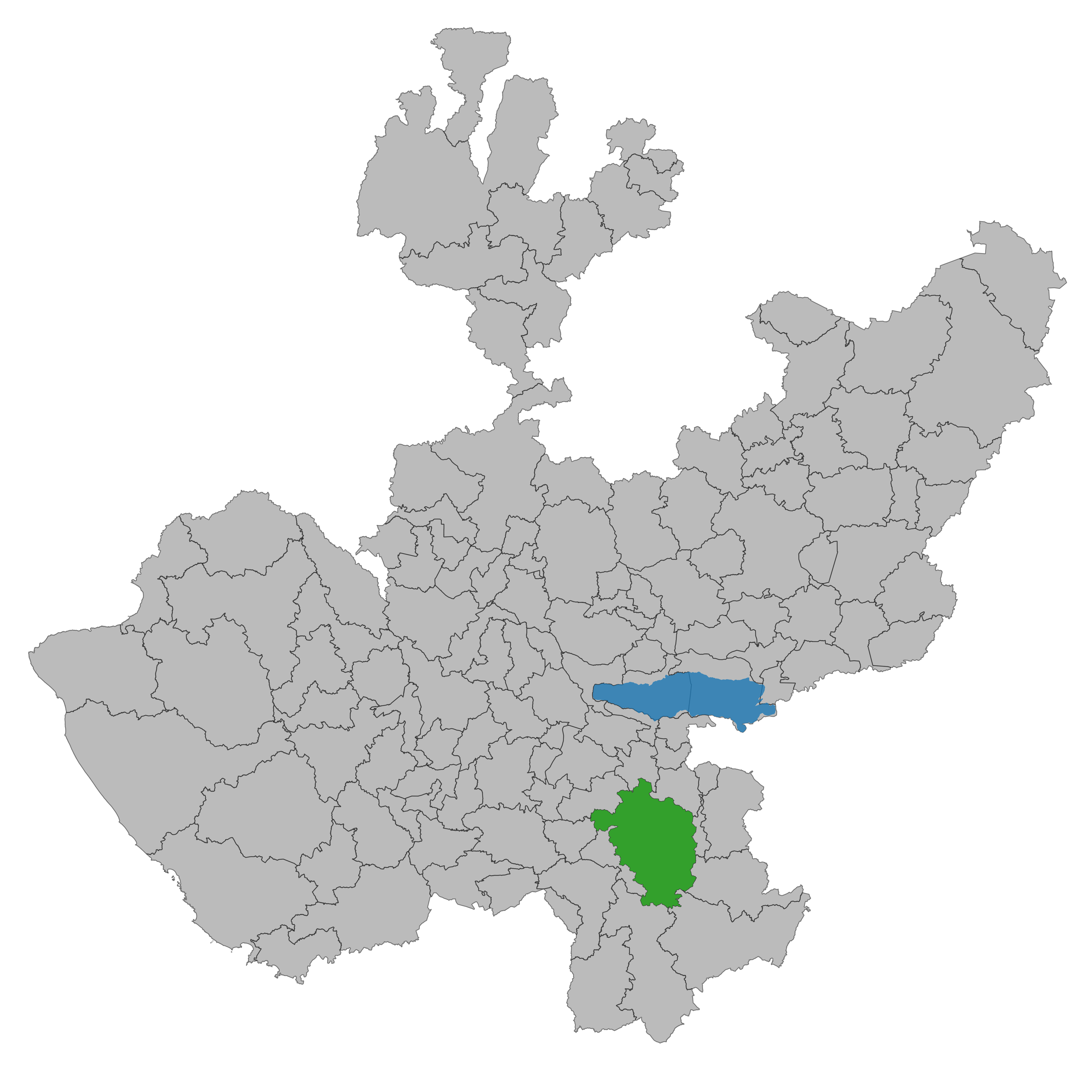
- Location of the municipality in Jalisco

- Location in Mexico Tamazula de Gordiano (Mexico)
- Coordinates: 19°38′N 103°15′W
- Country: Mexico
- State: Jalisco

Area
  - Total: 1,364 km^{2} (527 sq mi)
  - City: 7.61 km^{2} (2.94 sq mi)

Population (2020 census)
  - Total: 38,955
  - Density: 28.56/km^{2} (73.97/sq mi)
  - City: 19,113
  - City density: 2,510/km^{2} (6,500/sq mi)
- Time zone: UTC-6 (Central Standard Time)

Tamazula de Gordiano (locally [tamaˈsula ðe ɣoɾˈðjano], also known as Tamazula) is a city in the Mexican state of Jalisco. The word "tamazula" comes from the Nahuatl word tamazullan, which means "place or lagoon of toads."

== Municipality ==
Tamazula is the seat of the municipality of the same name (Tamazula de Gordiano). The municipality is a territorial extension of 1364 km^{2}. It is divided into municipal delegations:

1. La Garita
2. Contla
3. Vista Hermosa
4. Morelos (Santa Rosa)
5. Nigromante (San Juan de la Montaña)
6. El Tulillo

== Population ==
Tamazula recently gained city status after the 2010 census reported that the municipality had 37,986 residents. A vast majority of the city's residents are employed at the Ingenio Azucarero de Tamazula, S.A. de C.V. where sugar cane from the surrounding vicinities within the municipality is turned into sugar and alcohol.

The ingenio (sugar mill) as it is known by the people here is the major source of revenue for the city and the municipality as a whole, followed by tourism and trade.

On October 17, 2007: Adrián Gil Pérez, the chronicler of the city, made public a proposal to name the town from this date forward as "La perla del sureste de Jalisco", or the Pearl of the Southeast of Jalisco.

== Festivities ==
Every year between January 20 and February 2 is the festival of Our Lady of Sagrario. During these two weeks there are events for the whole family and for all tastes. Many internationally recognized stars come to the festival to play there, such as Banda El Recodo, Banda "Arrolladora" El Limón, Banda Ms, Joan Sebastian, and Mariachi Internacional Vargas de Tecalitlan as well as comedy shows from comedians like Teo Gonzalez, Jo Jo Jorge Falcon, Jorge "Coque" Muñiz.
