= Original Friends Dolls =

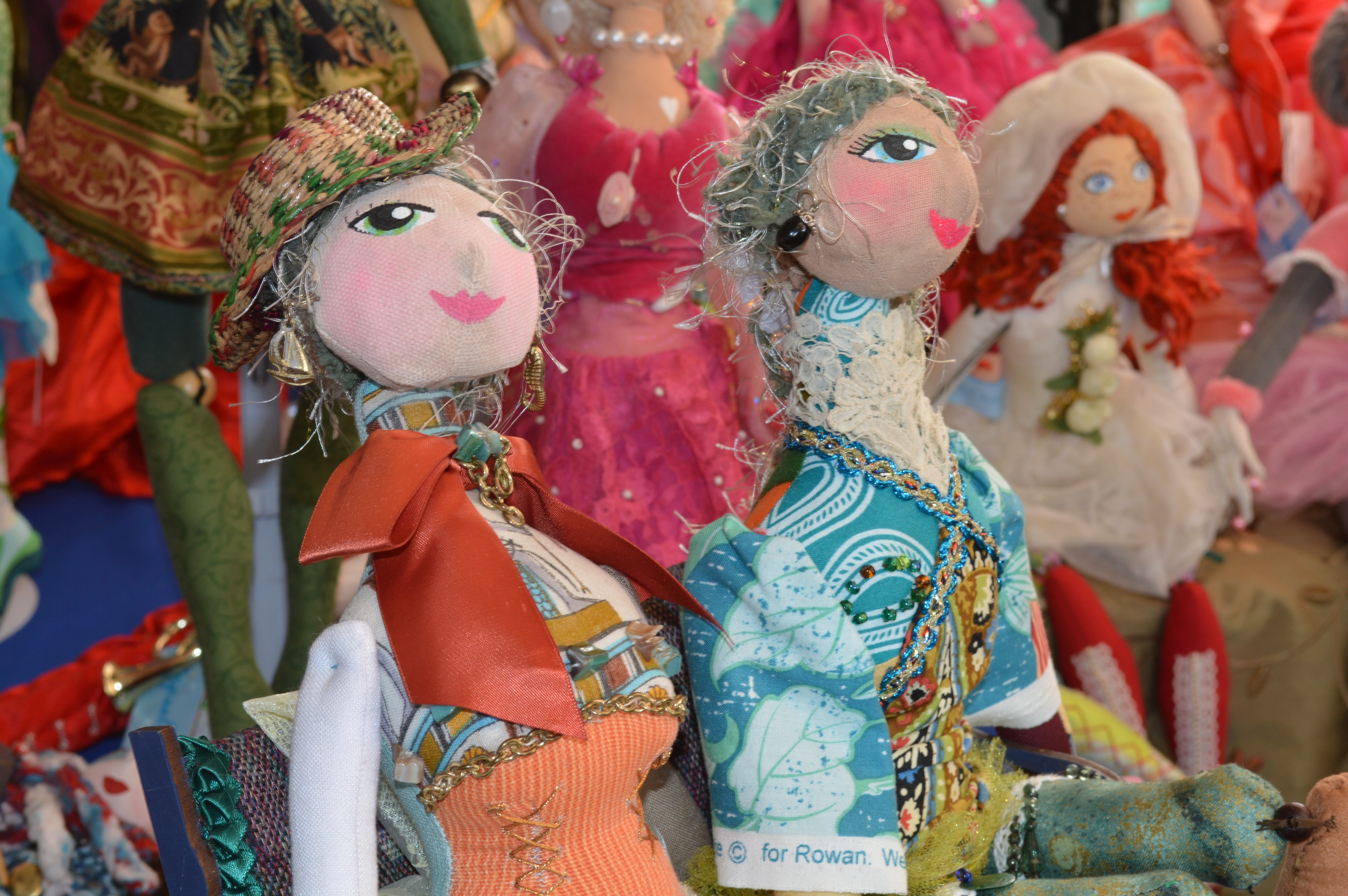
- Dolls at the Feria Maestros del Arte
- Founder: Rebecca Roth and Esmeralda Hernández José
- Founded at: Guadalajara
- Website: http://prisondolls.com

Original Friends Dolls is a project run at the Reclusorio Feminil of Puente Grande prison just outside Guadalajara, Mexico, which aims to provide women at the facility a better means of making money then through the prison programs. It was begun in 2008 by Rebecca Roth and Esmeralda Hernández José. The inspiration for the project was the making of a cloth doll by Roth for the young daughter of one of her cellmates. Hernández José noted the need for another means of earning income, so the two decided to make and sell the dolls, using scrap cloth. The program was successful, with about 100 dolls sold before Roth even left the prison in 2010. Since then more than 1,200 have been sold to collectors and other, primarily in Mexico and the United States. Since 2010, the project has sold dolls through the Feria Maestros del Arte, a major handcraft fair in Mexico.

== Origin of the dolls ==
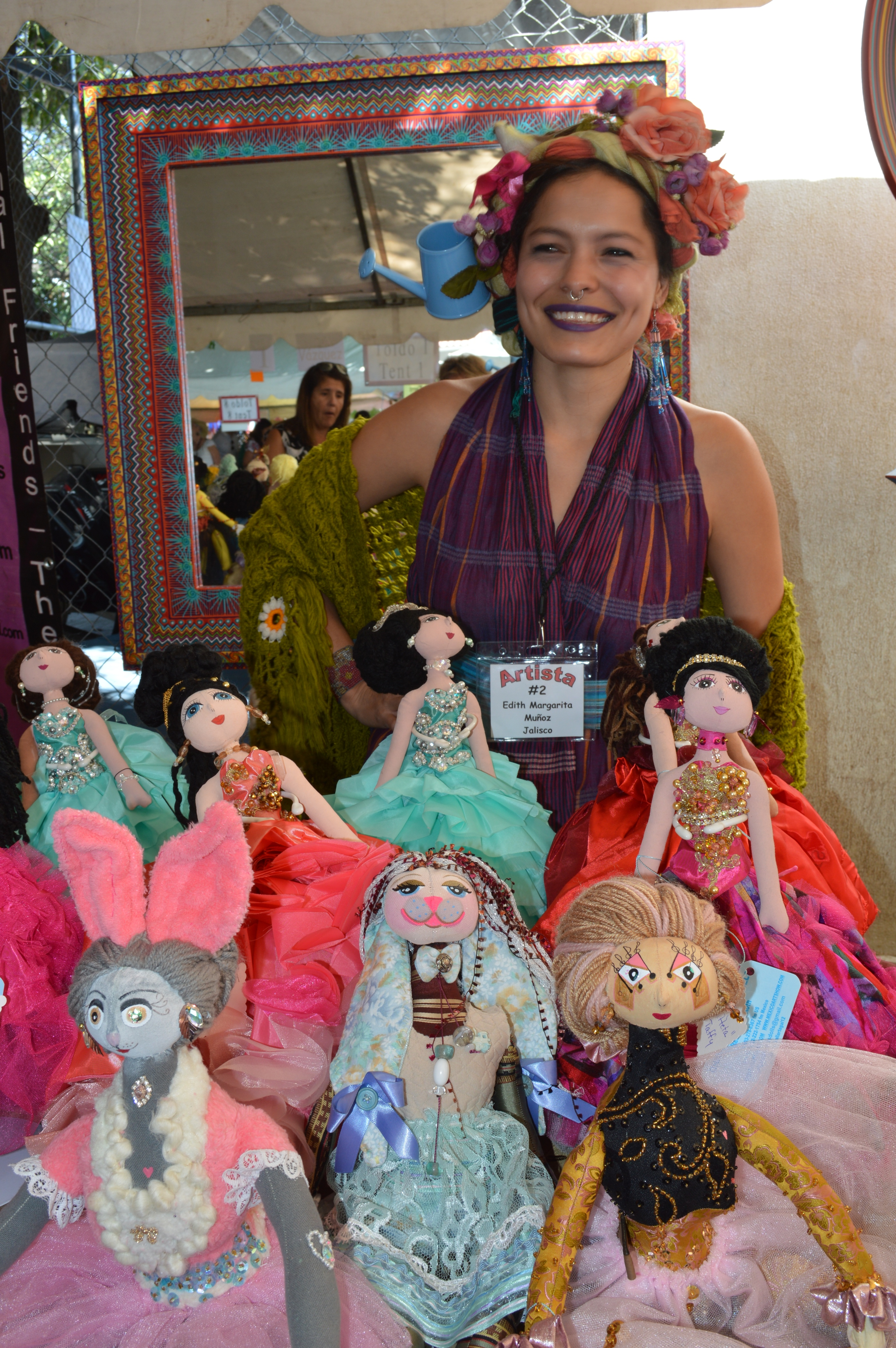
Edith Margarita Muñoz of Original Friends Dolls at the 2015 Feria de los Maestros del Arte in Chapala, Jalisco

The dolls are the brainchild of Rebecca Roth, an American who moved to Puerto Vallarta in 1998. From then until 2006, she lived as a shop owner in the city. At age 47, Roth was arrested by Mexican authorities and from 2006 to 2010, was in a prison just outside Guadalajara while her case went through the system. The Mexican legal process is very long, with much time passing before a case is resolved. In the meantime, those arrested must stay in jail.

While the prison has a pleasant common area with orange and lime trees as well as roses, along with a court for volleyball, tennis and basketball, she lived with thirteen other women in a prison cell meant for six people. The stress of prison life and legal limbo moved her to re-explore her creative interests as a coping mechanism, working on painting, drawing and writing poetry, as well as taking classes in Spanish and teaching English.

One of the people in her cell block was a 15-month girl named Lupita, born at the prison because the Mexican prison system allows conjugal visits. It also allows the mothers of such children to keep them there until age three. However, the little girl had no toys, except for two empty plastic Coke bottles to kick around. Having taken some basic sewing classes, Roth made a doll for the girl, which had orange yarn hair, painted purple eyes, red lips, and freckles; and had a white blouse, with a multi-colored skirt. She was nothing like the later dolls, but Lupita immediately named her “Mia” (mine) . Mother and child were later relocated to another facility, and then released. They now live ina small town outside of Puerto Vallarta. When Roth made the doll for Lupita, she had no idea that it would become something more.

In 2008, one of her cellmates, Esmeralda Hernandez Jose, stated she needed to find a way to make money. Prisoners must earn the money they need for basic supplies. There are jobs at the prison but they pay very little. Roth’s suggestion was to make ten dolls similar to Lupita’s and put them in the upcoming prison art show to try and sell. This they did, and the first one of several sold was bought by the prison director. After that, guards, visitors and others began to order them. This success persuaded the women to continue the work and name the project Original Friends Dolls, at Hernández José’s suggestion.

While she was still in prison, over 100 dolls were sold. The making of the dolls served as an outlet for her depression and frustration. Released in 2010 after an appeals court overturned her sentence for lack of evidence. As of 2015, Hernández José has not been sentenced.

== The project today ==
Despite the experience Roth has decided to stay in Mexico and continue the project, working with volunteers both inside and outside Reclusorio Feminil of Puente Grande in Jalisco. The team the runs the project today consists of Roth, Hernández José, Edith Margarita Núñez Espinoza, and Sandra Ramos Aceves.

Admiring the work of makers such as Eleanor Peace Bailey and Patti Culea, the dolls have evolved since the creation of Mia. However, 85-90% of the materials are still scraps, mostly from donations and other found items which are then recycled. These materials include fabric, ribbons, lace, buttons, paint, broken jewelry, seed pearls and various other odds and ends. Many of the donations are from people who have cleaned out closets and drawers to help the project.

Each doll is unique, with a name, number and signed by the artist who made it. They come as a number of characters which include mermaids, fairies, dancers, witches and more. They also take special orders. The faces are hand-painted, and all dolls come with a unique outfit, underwear and some unique accessory.

The dolls have been trademarked since 2011, and as of 2015, the project has sold over 1,200 dolls. They are sold at various outlets in Jalisco, such as in Ajijic, Chapala, Tlaquepaque and Puerto Vallarta, as well as on the Internet through Facebook, E Bay and Mercado Libre, and are regularly shipped to the United States. Since 2010, the project has been invited to participate in the Feria Maestros del Arte, a major handcraft and folk art show in Mexico. Roth has received photos of the dolls in their new homes from all over the world. The women who make the dolls, generally make one per week and are paid each Friday. Any profit from the sales is split between Roth and Hernández José.

Roth still makes dolls, but less so because of the demands of travel and running the project. The program has grown, but is still limited to one prison, but now has a waiting list of women who want to participate. In 2013, Canadian photographer and collector of Original Friends Dolls Barbara Nettleson was allowed inside the prison to photograph the project.
