= Chapala, Jalisco =

Chapala
- Municipality and town
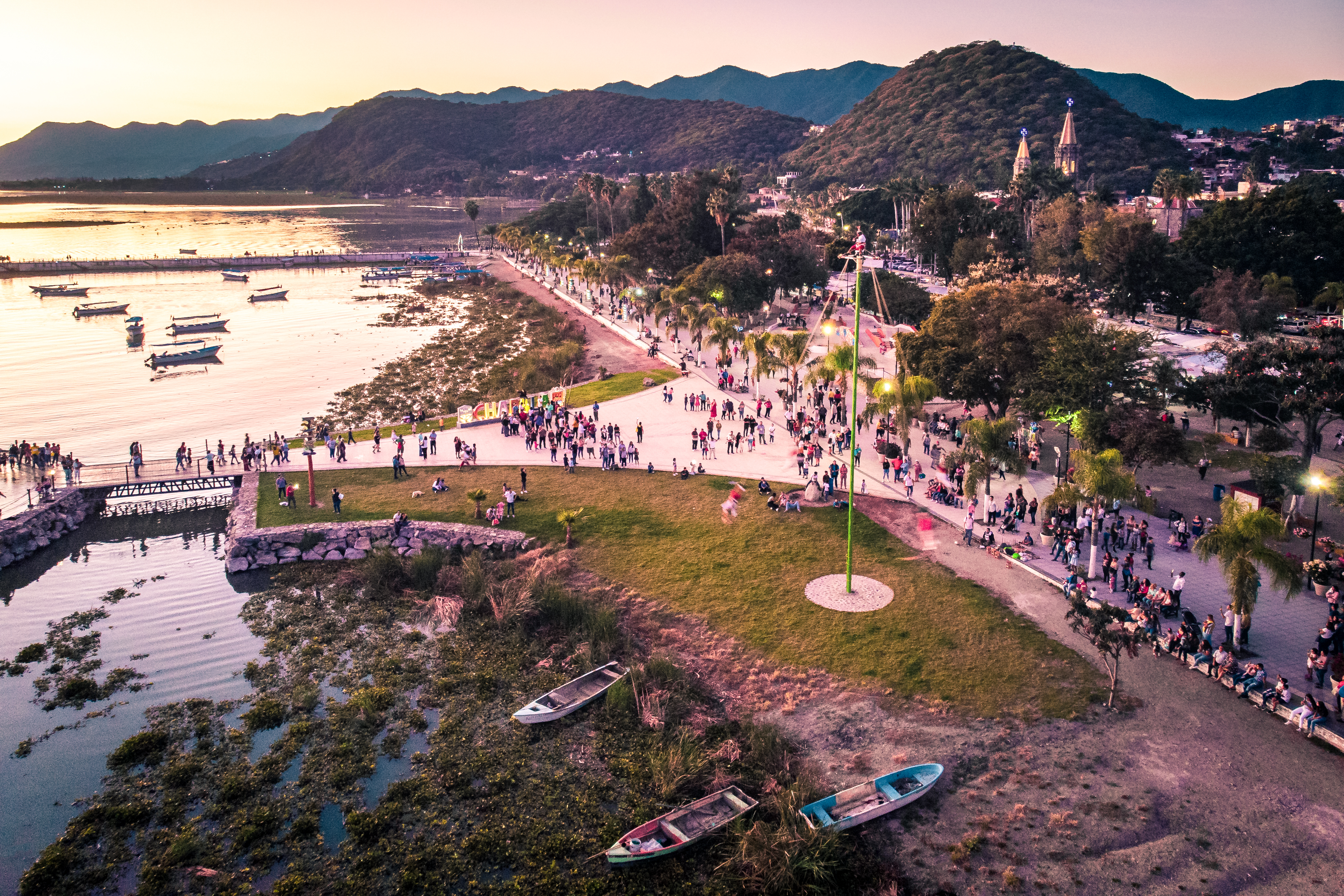

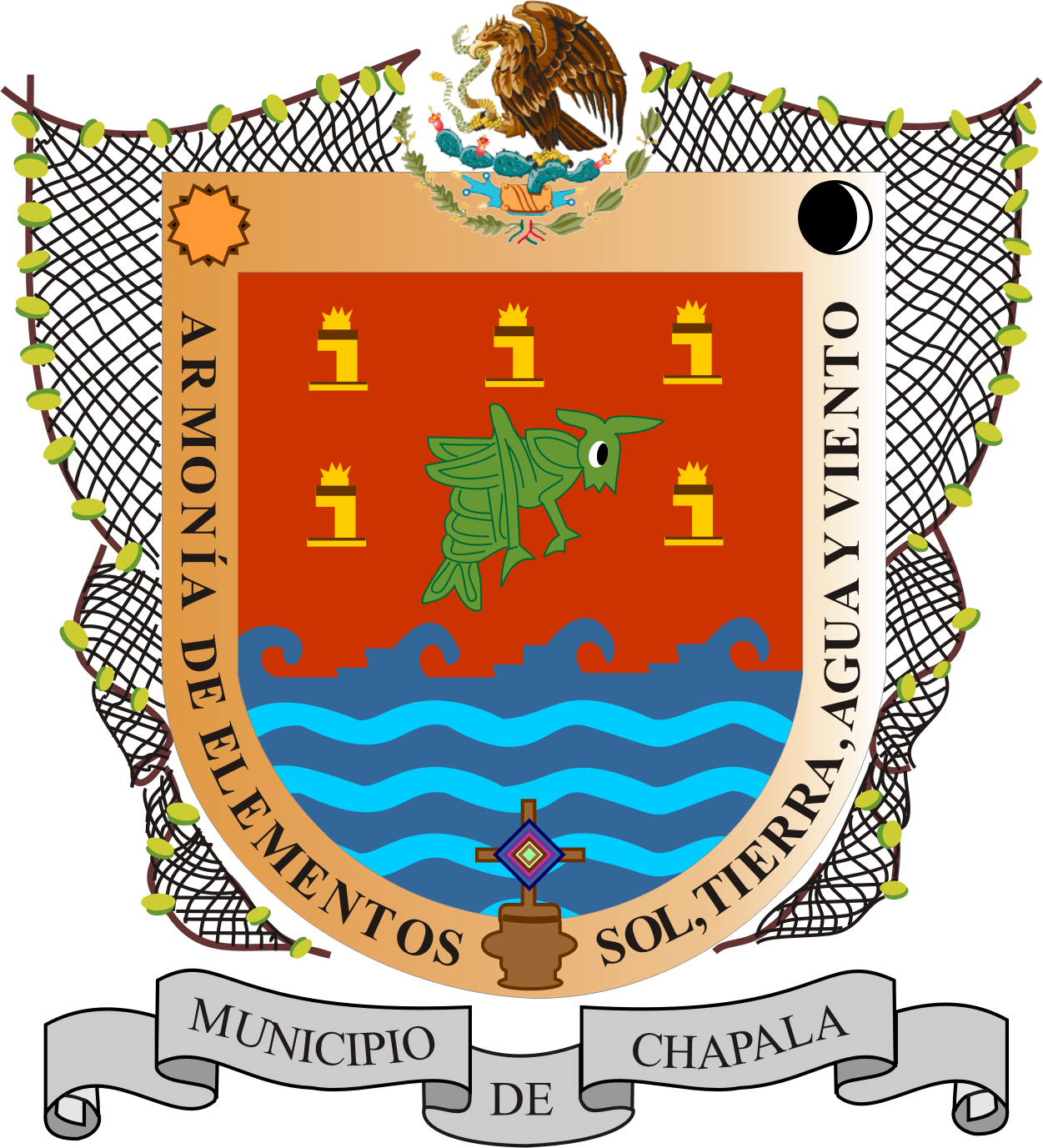
- Coat of arms

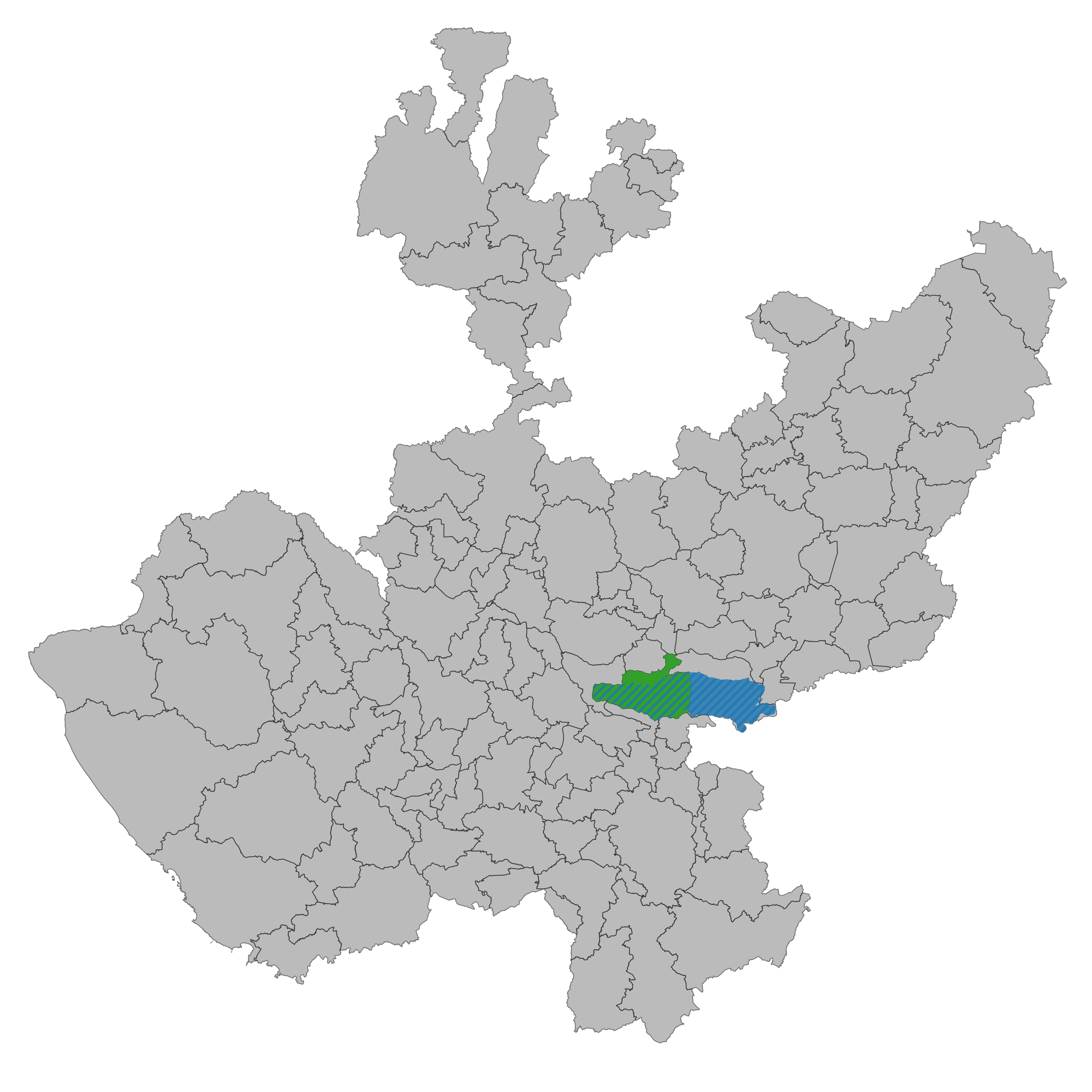
- Municipality location in Jalisco

- Location in Mexico
- Coordinates: 20°18′19″N 103°11′5″W
- Country: Mexico
- State: Jalisco

Area
  - Total: 630 km^{2} (240 sq mi)
  - Town: 5.43 km^{2} (2.10 sq mi)

Population (2020 census)
  - Total: 55,196
  - Density: 88/km^{2} (230/sq mi)
  - Town: 24,352
  - Town density: 4,480/km^{2} (11,600/sq mi)
- Time zone: UTC-6 (Central (US Central))
- Website: (in Spanish) Official site

Chapala (Spanish: [tʃaˈpala]) is a town and municipality in the central Mexican state of Jalisco, located on the north shore of Lake Chapala, Mexico's largest freshwater lake. According to the 2015 census, its population is 50,738 for the municipality. The municipality includes about 11,000 in the town of Ajijic.

== History ==
Although there are several theories as to the origin of the city's name, the most likely is that it comes from Chapalac, the name of the last chief of the Nahuatl-speaking indigenous people of the region. Chapala became an official municipality on September 10, 1864, by decree of the Jalisco State Congress.

== Geography ==
Chapala is 28 miles (45 km) south-southeast of Guadalajara, on Mexican Federal Highway 44. It is located at 20°20' North, 103°10' West. Chapala lies along the north shore of Lake Chapala, the largest freshwater lake in Mexico. The region features a mix of low mountains and flat lakeside terrain, giving it scenic views and fertile soil. Its proximity to Guadalajara makes it a popular weekend destination for both locals and tourists. The town is part of the Sierra Madre Occidental foothills, which contribute to its mild climate and breezy conditions. Several small rivers and streams feed into the lake, supporting local agriculture and fishing.

== Climate ==
Climate data for Chapala
Month	Jan	Feb	Mar	Apr	May	Jun	Jul	Aug	Sep	Oct	Nov	Dec	Year
Record high °C (°F)	30.0 (86.0)	32.0 (89.6)	34.5 (94.1)	37.0 (98.6)	39.0 (102.2)	36.5 (97.7)	35.0 (95.0)	36.5 (97.7)	31.0 (87.8)	33.5 (92.3)	30.0 (86.0)	30.0 (86.0)	39.0 (102.2)
Mean daily maximum °C (°F)	22.7 (72.9)	24.4 (75.9)	27.0 (80.6)	28.9 (84.0)	30.3 (86.5)	28.5 (83.3)	26.2 (79.2)	26.0 (78.8)	25.7 (78.3)	25.4 (77.7)	24.5 (76.1)	22.8 (73.0)	26.0 (78.8)
Daily mean °C (°F)	17.0 (62.6)	18.1 (64.6)	20.2 (68.4)	22.0 (71.6)	23.4 (74.1)	22.8 (73.0)	21.2 (70.2)	21.1 (70.0)	20.9 (69.6)	20.3 (68.5)	19.0 (66.2)	17.4 (63.3)	20.3 (68.5)
Mean daily minimum °C (°F)	11.2 (52.2)	11.9 (53.4)	13.4 (56.1)	15.0 (59.0)	16.5 (61.7)	17.1 (62.8)	16.3 (61.3)	16.3 (61.3)	16.1 (61.0)	15.1 (59.2)	13.4 (56.1)	12.0 (53.6)	14.5 (58.1)
Record low °C (°F)	4.0 (39.2)	2.0 (35.6)	7.0 (44.6)	10.0 (50.0)	5.0 (41.0)	11.5 (52.7)	10.0 (50.0)	10.0 (50.0)	9.0 (48.2)	9.0 (48.2)	7.5 (45.5)	2.0 (35.6)	2.0 (35.6)
Average precipitation mm (inches)	18.5 (0.73)	4.5 (0.18)	2.8 (0.11)	5.5 (0.22)	18.6 (0.73)	184.1 (7.25)	261.1 (10.28)	205.4 (8.09)	163.6 (6.44)	50.2 (1.98)	12.8 (0.50)	7.7 (0.30)	934.8 (36.80)
Average precipitation days (≥ 0.1 mm)	1.9	1.0	0.5	0.9	2.8	14.5	19.8	17.7	13.8	5.5	1.7	1.8	81.9
Source: Servicio Meteorologico Nacional

== Culture ==
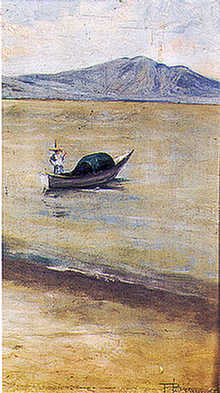
Chapala by Brazilian Mexican painter Félix Bernardelli, 1899

During the First World War, in 1915, Norwegian speculators intended to make Chapala a luxury resort town. A railway was to be built, with race segregated carriages. In addition to the railway, the speculators would also provide two motor vessels to navigate the lake with connections to the other small towns at the lake shore. A first class hotel was to be built, as well as an automobile club with attached casino. An extensive dam, 8 kilometers long to provide dry land with plots for luxury dwellings. What the shareholders in the company, "Compania di Fromento di Chapala" received, was only photographs of railway carriages and locomotives. See the book; Gullfeber by Kr.Fr.Brøgger, published in Oslo 1932.

In the late 1940s the American writer Tennessee Williams settled in Chapala for a while to work on a play called The Poker Night, which later became A Streetcar Named Desire. As Williams explains in his essay "The Catastrophe of Success," Chapala offered him an ideal place to work, "a remote place among strangers where there is good swimming."

Since the 1960s, Chapala has been frequented by both Mexican and international tourists. Among the area's cultural attractions is mariachi music, which originated in the state of Jalisco. While many fine mariachi bands have been based in Chapala, the most famous groups are based in larger cities nearby. The most famous mariachi in Mexico is Mariachi Vargas de Tecalitlán, founded in the late 19th century in the southern Jalisco city of Tecalitlán, but now based in Mexico City. Although mariachi music is believed to have originated in the town of Cocula, the greatest concentration of mariachis can be found in the city of Guadalajara, located about 30 miles north of Chapala; it is considered the city that most epitomizes the external concept of Mexico propagated by the international mass media (characterized by charros, tequila, sombreros, and mariachis). A worldwide mariachi festival is held there each fall, mariachis from throughout the world (including Europe and Asia) regularly participate.

== Tourism ==
Tony Burton describes early tourism in his book "Lake Chapala through the ages: an anthology of travellers' tales." Chapala, along with its namesake lake, is well established as a weekend getaway destination primarily for inhabitants of the city of Guadalajara. Most of the area's immigrant population (originating primarily from the United States and Canada) reside not in the city proper but in and around Ajijic, a village of approximately 11,000 inhabitants located approximately 5 miles west of Chapala. Many of these residents stay for a long time, and some try to make Chapala like "home."

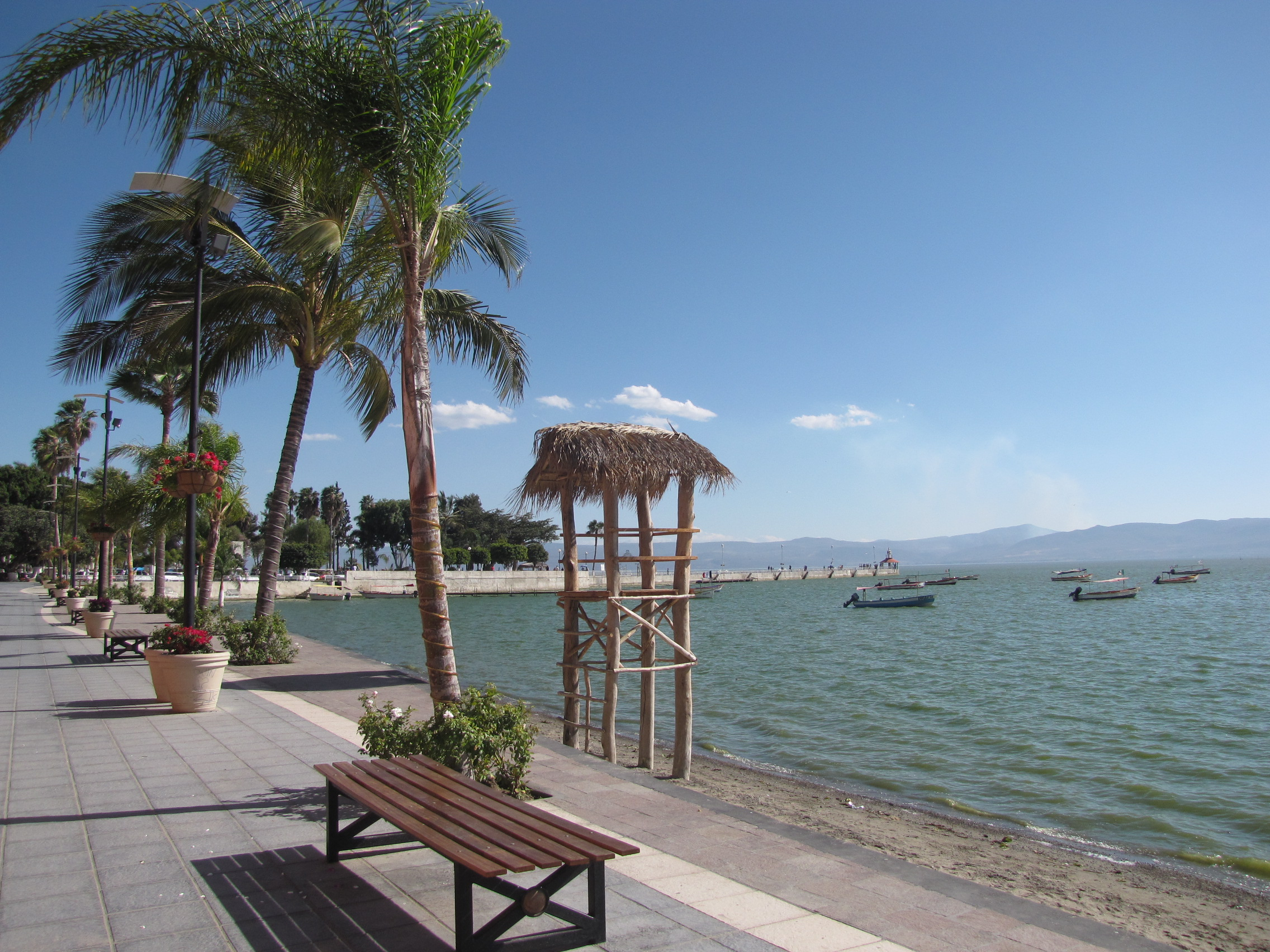
The Chapala beach viewed from the Malecon

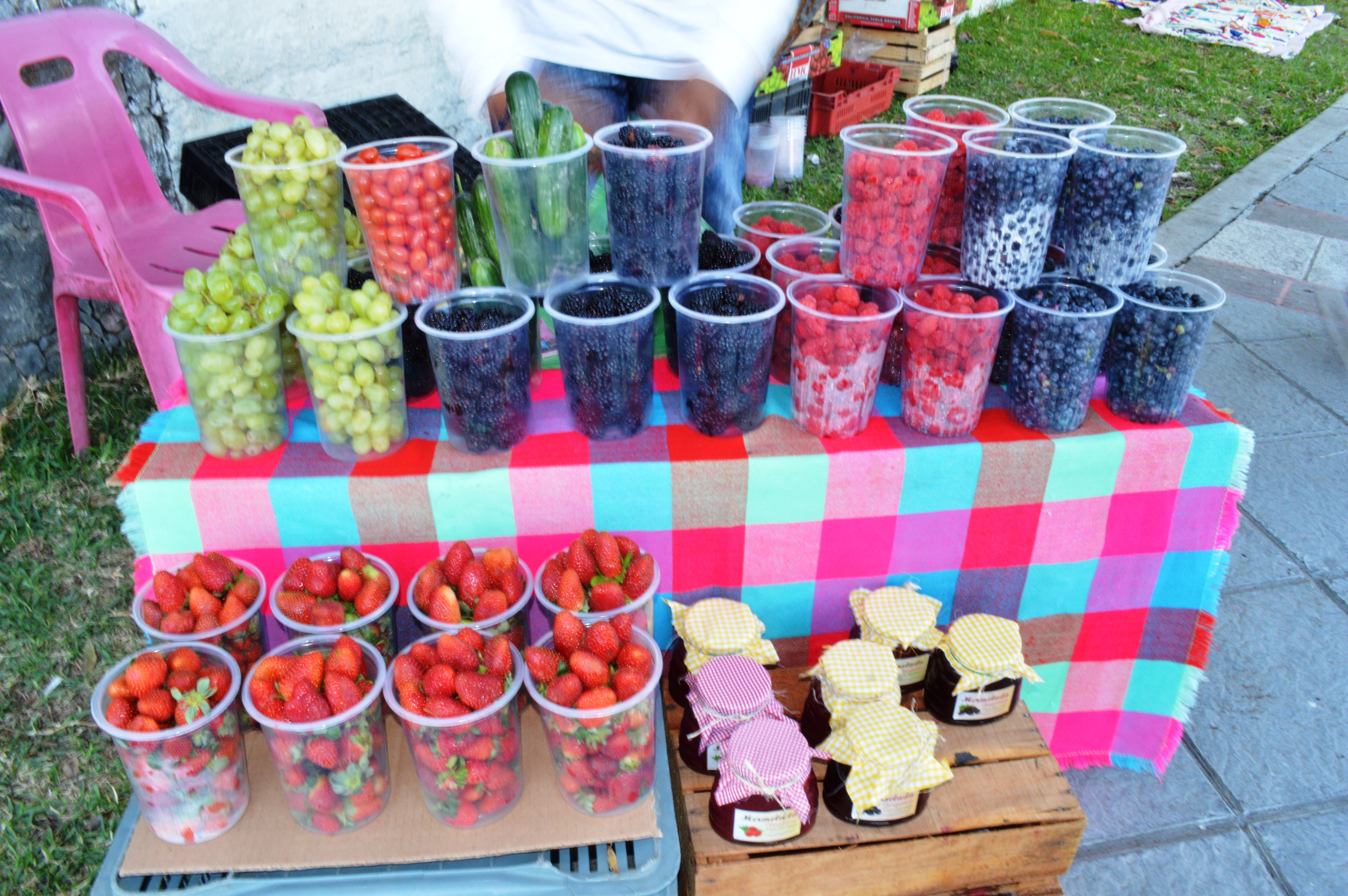
Fresh produce for sale in Chapala

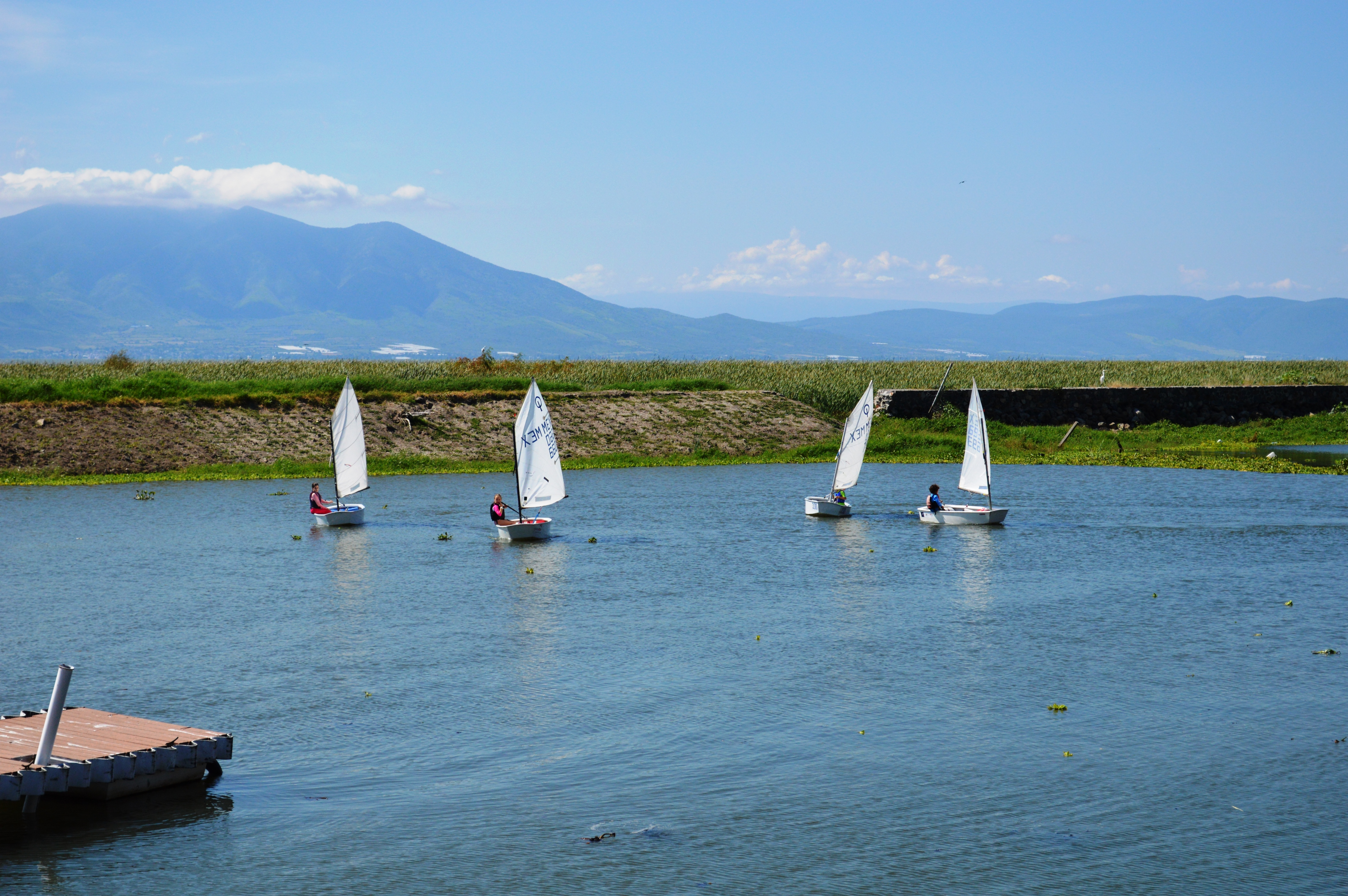
Harbor at the Chapala Yacht Club

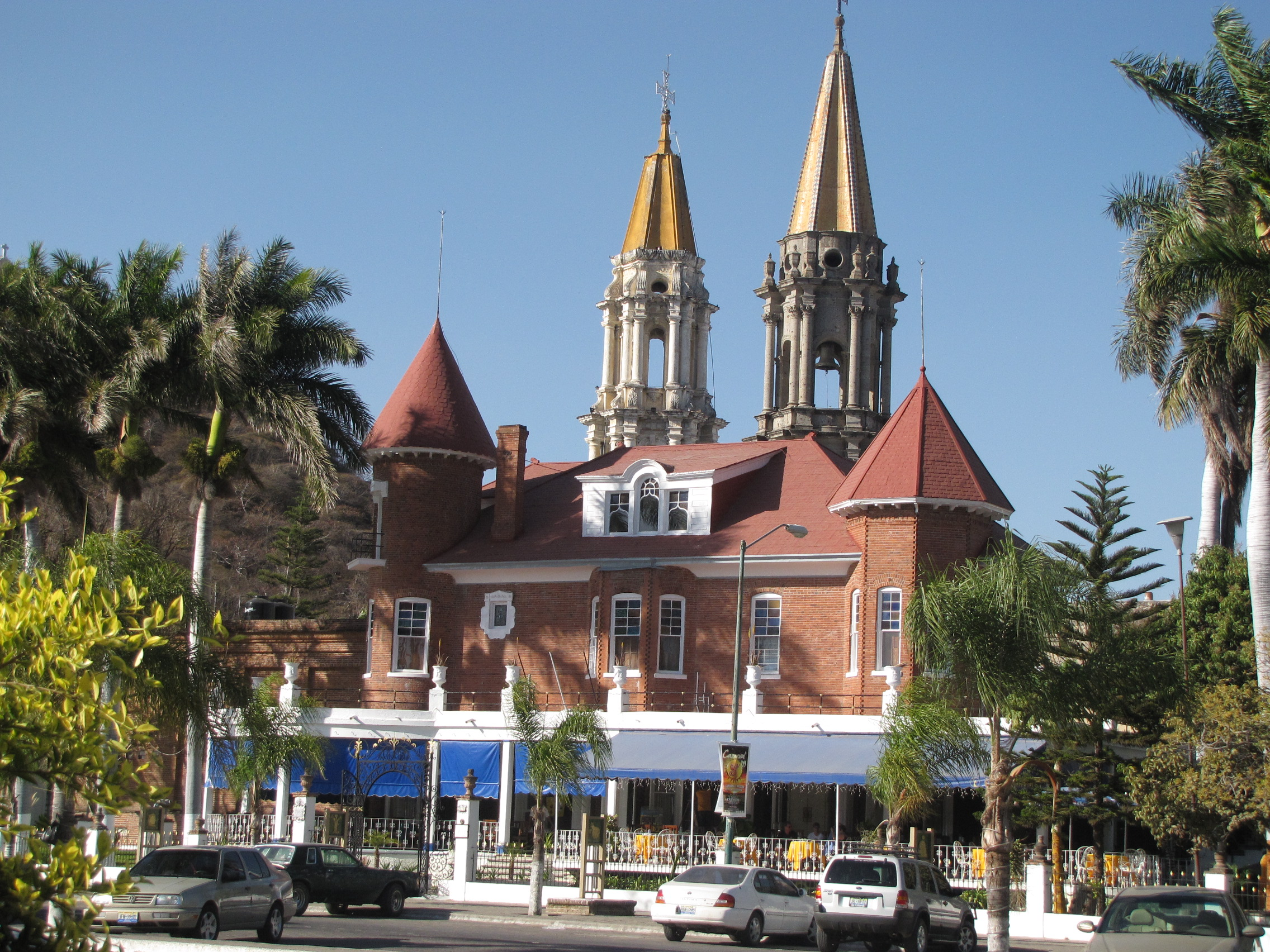
Hotel by the Chapala Malecon, with St. Francis of Assisi Church in background

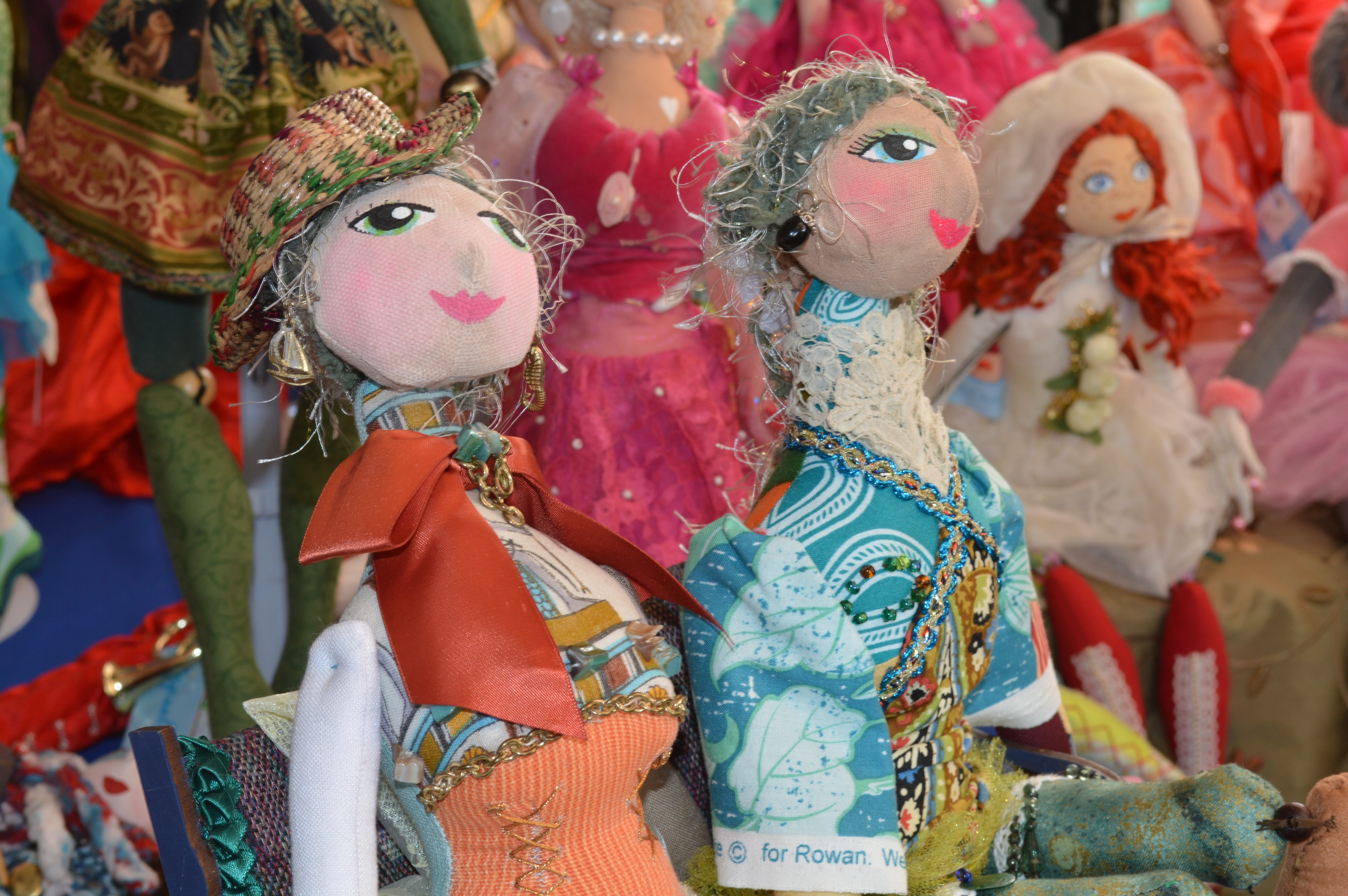
Original Friends Dolls at the 2015 Feria de los Maestros del Arte

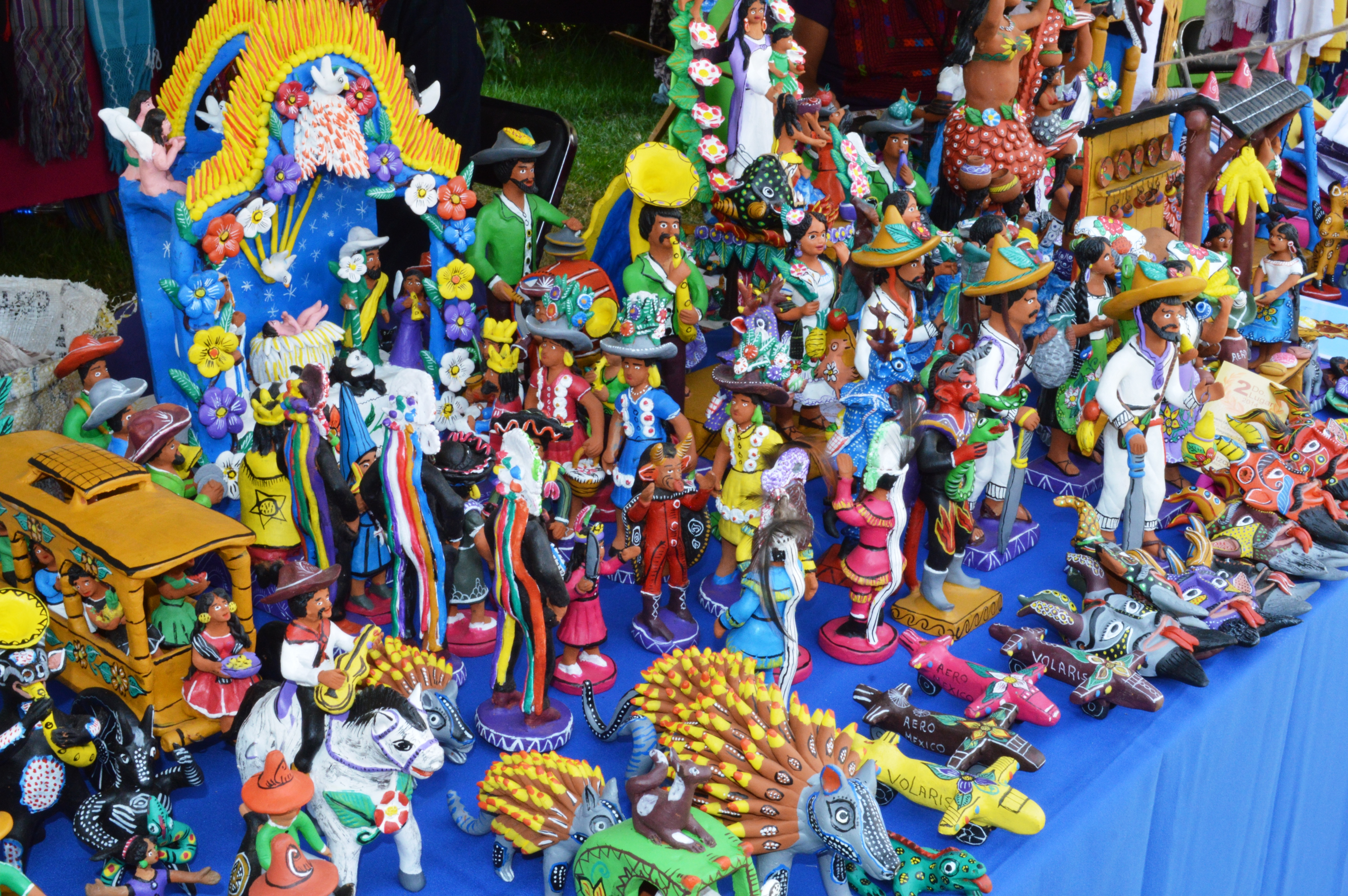
Ceramic figures by José Juan García Aguilar at the 2015 Feria de los Maestros del Arte

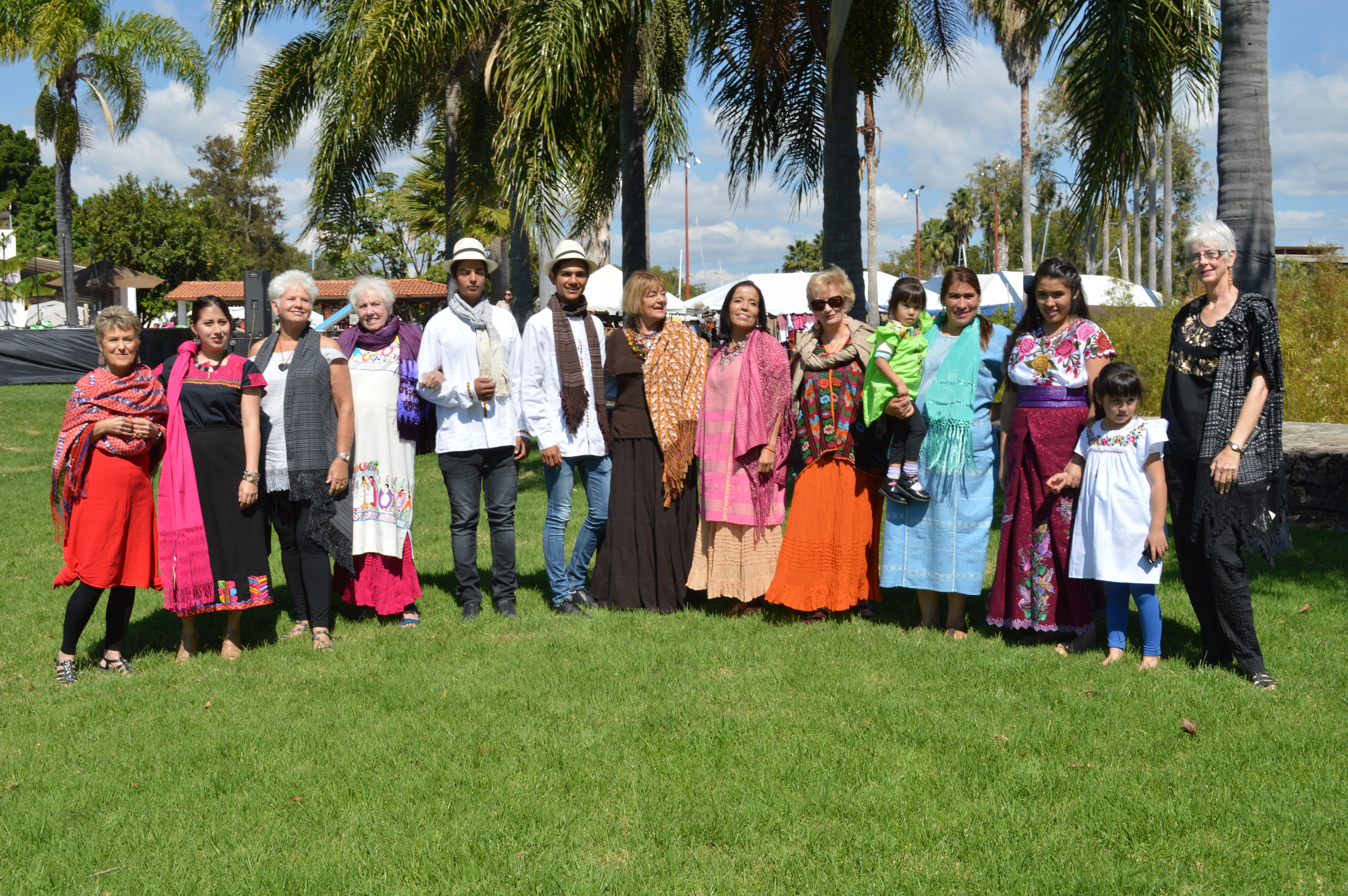
Participants in a fashion show at the 2015 Feria de los Maestros del Arte

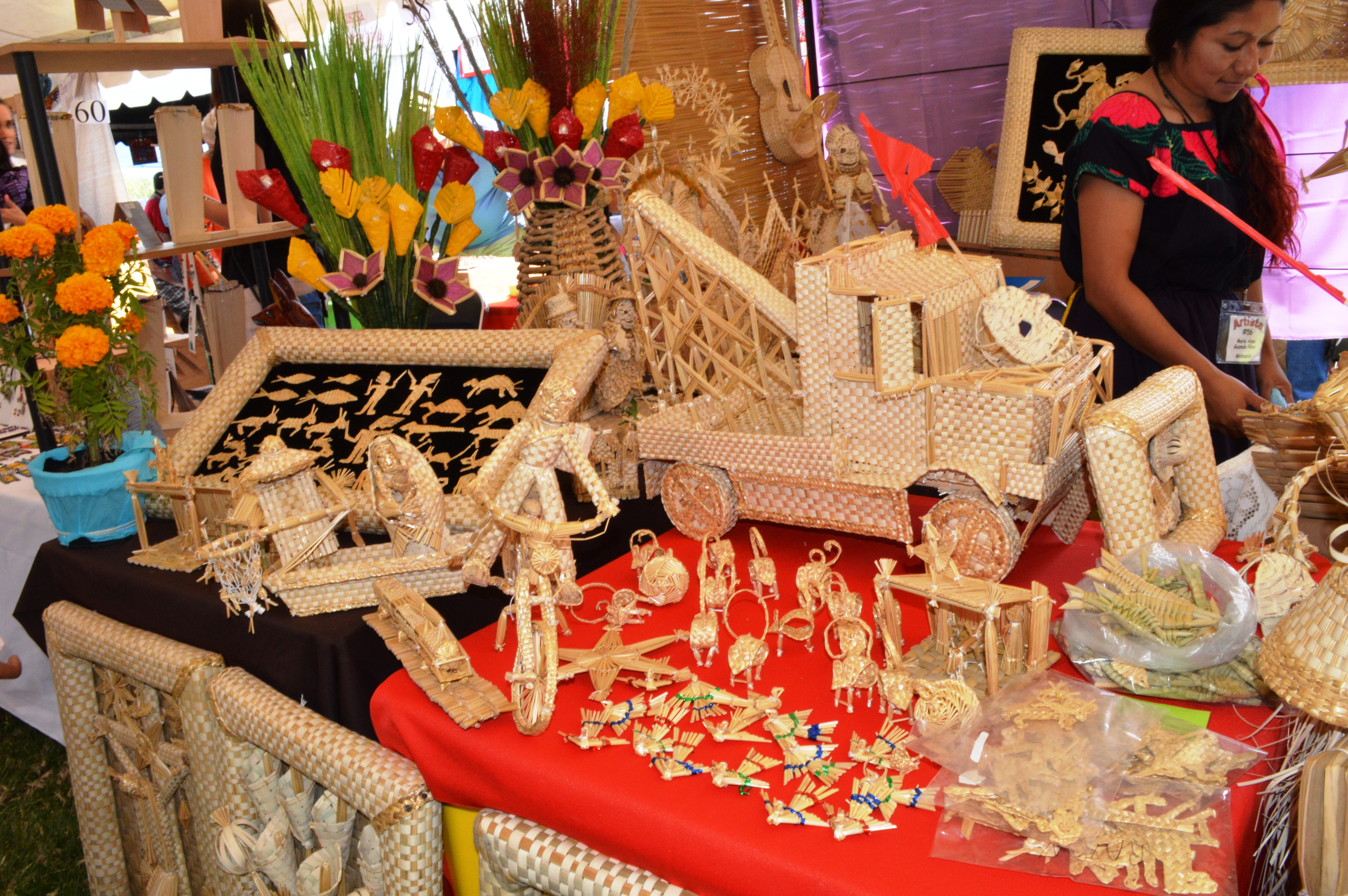
Woven reed merchandise by the Faustino Guzman family at the 2015 Feria de los Maestros del Arte

== Government ==
=== Municipal presidents ===
Municipal president	Term	Political party	Notes
Juan Beltrán Alatorre	1983–1985	PRI	
J. Antonio Rivera Alcántar	1986–1988	PRI	
Alfonso Díaz Sosa	1989–1992	PRI	
José Raúl Robles Puga	1992–1995	PAN	
José Guadalupe Padilla Castañeda	1995–1997	PRI	
Alberto Alcántar Beltrán	1998–2000	PRI	
Alejandro de Jesús Aguirre Curiel	2001–2003	PAN	
Arturo Gutiérrez Tejeda	2004–2006	PAN	
Gerardo Degollado González	01-01-2007– 31-12-2009	PRI	
J. Jesús Cabrera Jiménez	01-01-2010– 30-09-2012	PAN	
Joaquín Huerta Barrios	01-10-2012– 30-09-2015	PAN	
Javier Degollado González	01/10/2015– 30/09/2018	PRI; PVEM	
Moisés Alejandro Anaya Aguilar	01-10-2018– 05-03-2021	MC	He applied for a temporary leave, to run for reelection, which he didn't get
Isaac Trejo Gracián	05-03-2021– 2021	MC	Acting municipal president
Alejandro de Jesús Aguirre Curiel	01-10-2021–	PAN	
