= Walter Clarence Thornton =

American model and modeling agent (1903–1990)

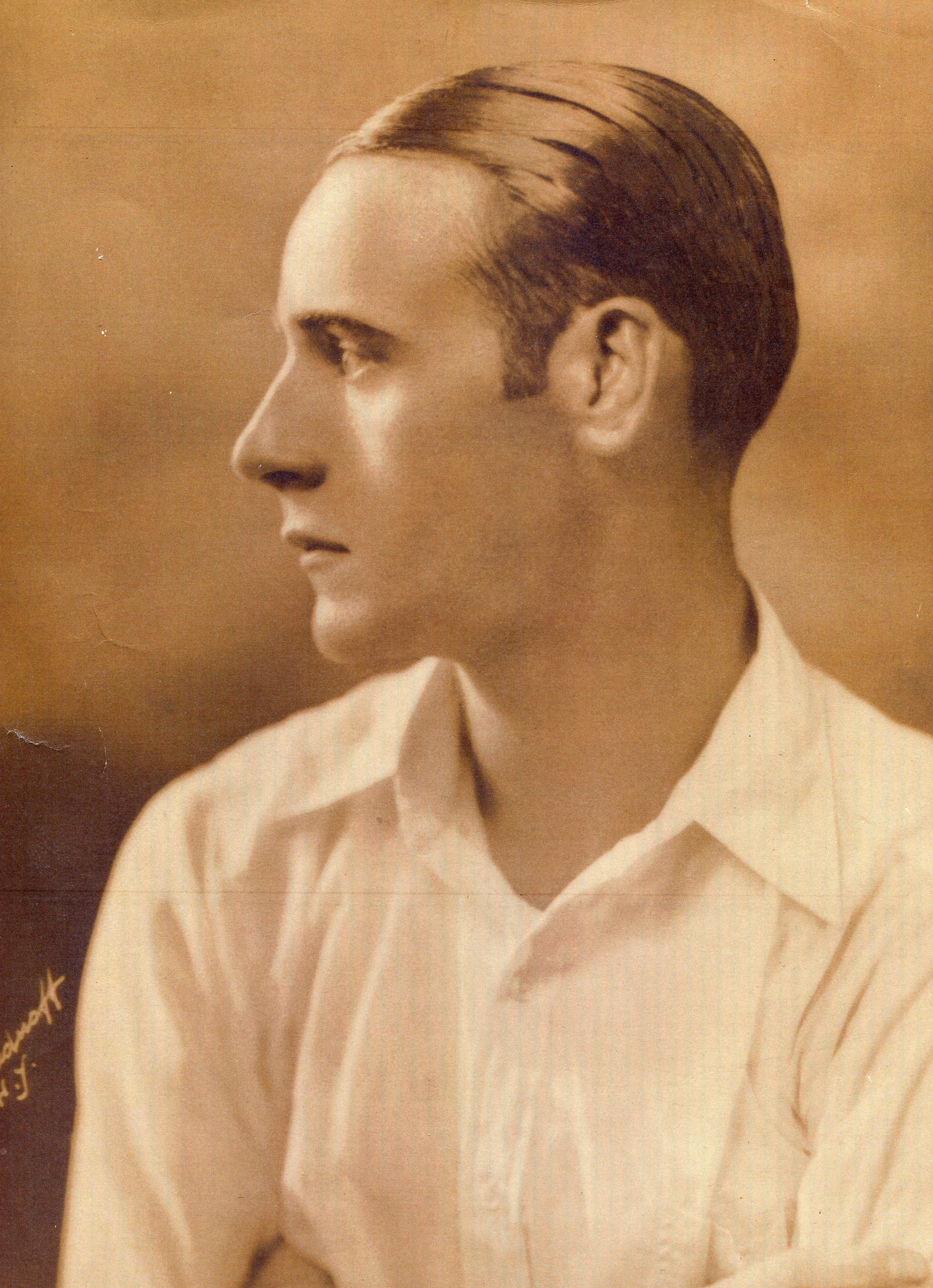
- Walter Thornton, by photographer Irving Chidnoff, 1926
- Born: April 3, 1903; Pike County, Ohio, U.S.
- Died: May 14, 1990 (aged 87); Long Beach, California, U.S.
- Resting place: Riverside National Cemetery
- Occupation: Modeling Agent
- Years active: 1926–1970
- Spouses: Judy Dolan (m. 1934; div. 1955) Candelaria Navarro (m. 1960)
- Children: 7

Walter Clarence Thornton (April 3, 1903 – May 14, 1990) was an American model and modeling agent who founded the Walter Thornton Model Agency in 1930 and went on to worldwide fame with his World War II-era "Walter Thornton Pin-Up Girls." Thornton rose to success from being an unsheltered orphan and a bricklayer. Thornton was twice a judge of the Miss America Pageant in Atlantic City, NJ (1933 and 1935). His company represented both male and female models, as well as a separate agency for child models. Many of his models achieved Hollywood fame and success. He retired from the agency in 1958 and spent the rest of his life in Ajijic, Mexico.

== Early life ==
Orphaned when he was young, Thornton enlisted in the Army to fight in World War I at the age of 14. Thornton was given an honorary discharge for "ineligibility." He later became a bricklayer.

In 1925, illustrator Georgia Warren spotted Walter Thornton on a park bench in New York City. She suggested he become a model. He did just that, signing on with The John Robert Powers Agency not long after (on whose roster he remained until 1931). He was known in the tight-knit artists' community of Greenwich Village in the late 1920s as "The Profile". He went on to pose for most of the leading artists, illustrators and photographers of the first half of the 20th century, including J.C. Leyendecker, Norman Rockwell, Alfred Cheney Johnston, Neysa McMein, Percy Edward Anderson, John La Gatta, Bradshaw Crandall, McClelland Barclay, C.D. Williams, Saul Tepper, Arthur William Brown, James Montgomery Flagg and Howard Chandler Christy. Thornton mass-marketed plaster copies of his own head.

== Modeling agency ==
The Minneapolis Tribune article referred to Thornton's face as one of the most well-known in America, due to his ubiquitous presence in 1920s advertisements. In 1928, Thornton created a small "head factory" (Walter Thornton & Co.) in a brownstone building near Grand Central Station, where he hand-crafted and sold plaster copies of his own head until 1931. Thornton's agent, John Robert Powers, offered the plaster heads to artists and sculptors to work from instead of the model. Reportedly, over 1,500 of the replications of Thornton's own head had been sold by 1930.

Thornton expanded that business to become the nation's first full service modeling agency in 1929. His agency was one of the first tenants of the newly-opened Chrysler Building. The Walter Thornton Modeling Agency came to be considered one of "The Big Three", the largest modeling agencies in the United States, from roughly 1930-1950, along with its competitors, John Robert Powers and Harry Conover. The Walter Thornton Model Agency became a prominent presence in the world of beauty in these earliest days of photographic modeling. Thornton standardized the business model of the model business, which continues to present day modeling agencies, with the agent receiving a flat 10% fee of a model's earnings. His agency was an intermediary liaison between model and client. The agency handled everything from wardrobe to booking the models' gigs, to offering lessons on deportment, grooming and grace.

In his syndicated column, Dale Carnegie wrote: "Why has Walter Thornton succeeded? Chiefly because he originated a new idea; something no one had thought of before. And stuck to it till he put it over. Simple."

== Models represented ==
The Walter Thornton Agency represented many models who went on to careers in Hollywood. Some of his models included Grace Kelly, Lauren Bacall, Arlene Dahl, Peggy Ann Garner, Dorothy Dell, Lizabeth Scott, Boots Mallory, Dolores Donlon, Anita Colby (model known as "The Face"), Starr and Tucker Faithfull Walda Winchell, a.k.a. "Toni Eden" (columnist Walter Winchell's troubled daughter), Cathy Downs, Diana Lynn, Dorothy McGuire, Grace Bradley, Hazel Brooks, Jean Muir and others. The Thornton Agency also had a male model division, representing later Hollywood luminaries, including actors Joseph Cotten, Alan Curtis, Brian Donlevy, Bob Hutton and Robert Kent among them.

Thornton's first discovery was a 19-year-old woman named Edythe Marrenner, who was nicknamed "The Brooklyn Bombshell" during her brief New York modeling career. She was chosen by Thornton to represent "Walter Thornton Beauty" for a 1937 feature article in The Saturday Evening Post. Marrenner was spotted in the article by Hollywood director, George Cukor, who brought her to Hollywood under short-term contract to Selznick Studios. The Thornton Agency sued her for breach of contract. They settled out of court in 1939, in Thornton's favor, reportedly for $20,000. In Hollywood, she changed her name to Susan Hayward.

At varying points in his career, Thornton had his own radio show, his own self-named weekly television show (The Walter Thornton Show, CBS, 1946) and his own nationally-syndicated monthly magazine column ("At the Court of The Merchant of Venus," 1939-41).

In April 1948, Thornton opened a chain of modeling schools (also known in as "charm schools") in Toronto. By 1962, he had three agencies operating in Canada and he had planned to open an additional nine more. By 1968 he had modeling schools in Toronto, Hamilton, St. Catherines, London, Welland, Niagara Falls, Belleville, Brampton, Oshawa and Barrie, among other cities. He sold his interest in the companies in 1980.

At the peak of his popularity and success, Thornton and his agency created the concept of "The Pin-Up Girl" during the 1940s, working in tandem with the U.S. government to provide these morale boosters for overseas G.I.s. The Thornton Agency trademarked the term "Walter Thornton Pin-Up Girls." The popularity of The Walter Thornton Pin-Up Girls led to multiple charting singles, including "Get a Pin-Up Girl!" by Don Wolf; "Pin-Up Polka" by Al Gamse and Irving Fields; and "The Walter Thornton Rhumba" also by Gamse and Fields.

In February 1946, Thornton and associates opened "The Pin-Up Room" in Manhattan, the walls of which were decorated with larger-than-life-sized pin-up photographs.

Thornton ran a stock photo publication of children, as well as representing his own child models under the name "Just Kids Models."

== Legal trouble ==
A series of legal issues and negative publicity started in 1954, which culminated in Thornton's retirement from his modeling agency. Thornton was charged with grand larceny, petit larceny and conspiracy, among other charges, on January 26, 1954, in relation to a purported "child model racket," with Thornton's "Just Kids" catalogues. Thornton was quoted as saying in Time Magazine that the District Attorney who was prosecuting him, T. Vincent Quinn, didn't have a case and furthermore was just manufacturing a smoke screen, to cover for his own legal problems. Federal District Attorney Quinn had a federal indictment of his own hanging over his head at the time Quinn pressed for the prosecution of Thornton. Quinn and his D.A. crew spared no expense in manufacturing evidence, to prove that Walter Thornton was a dishonest businessman, one who had "mulcted" (strong-armed) "...hundreds of parents out of $35 fees," relating to the parents' payments to have their children's photos listed in the "Just Kids" catalogues. The case was dismissed on June 3, 1954, by Judge Peter T. Farrell of Queens County Court in Long Island City, NY. All charges against Thornton were dismissed before the four-week-long case was even sent to the jury. "There is absolutely no basis to these charges," Judge Farrell pronounced.

Thornton spent the next four years pursuing legal action against the news outlets that had run the most defamatory headlines and articles about him. He filed a lawsuit for $3,000,000 in damages against the Hearst Corporation and others on May 21, 1955, claiming he had been libeled. His "trial by tabloid," however, had its desired effect: Thornton's name and reputation were destroyed after the month-long flurry of fictional, front-page headlines. Thornton either sold or closed all his New York business interests. The retractions and follow-up news that Thornton had been exonerated were printed, away from the front pages that had printed the news about his indictment and arrest in headlines.

== Personal life ==
Thornton married one of his models, Judy Dolan, in 1934 and had one daughter, Daryl, with her. Walter and Judy divorced in 1955.

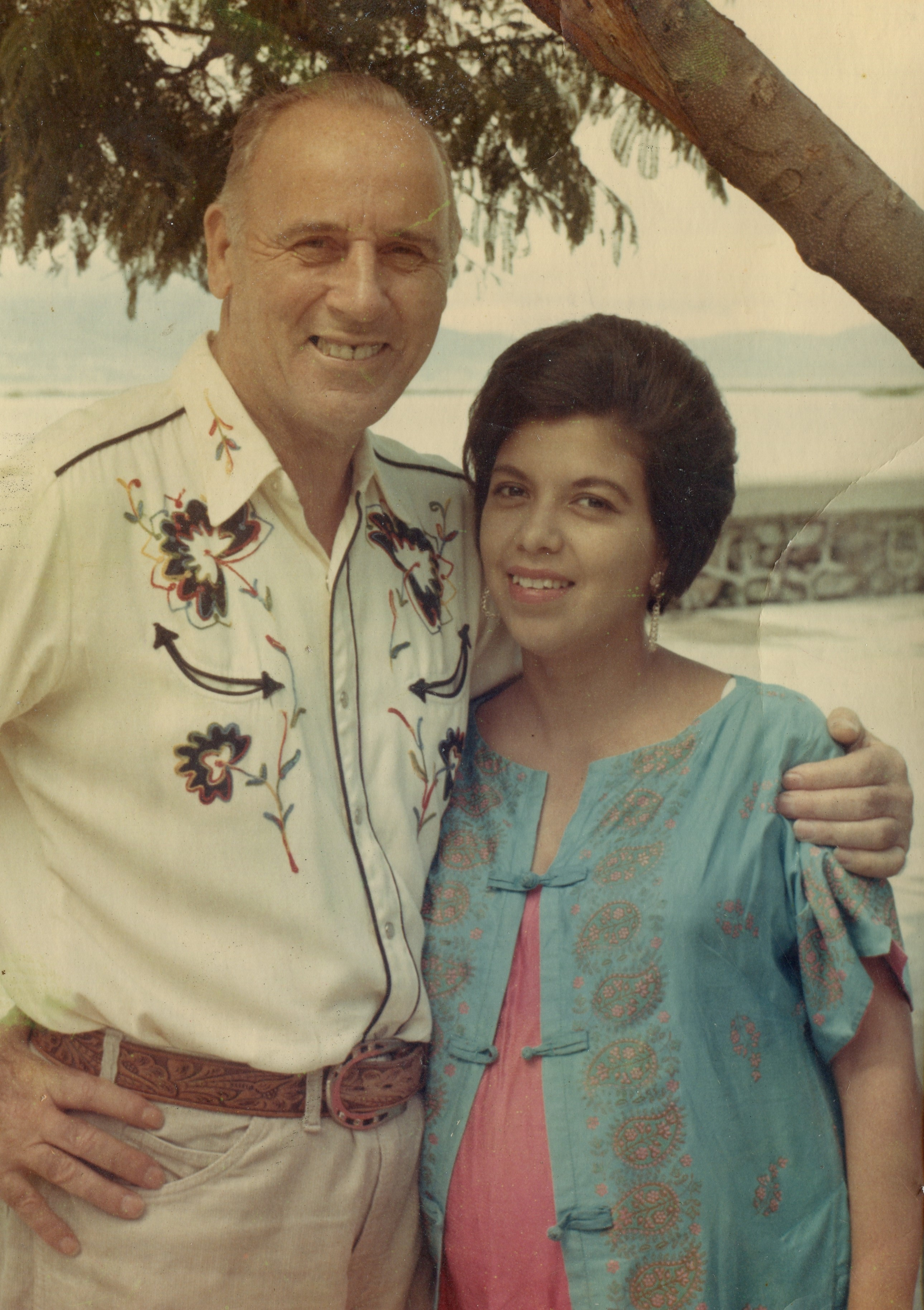
Thornton and Candelaria Navarro Thornton

Thornton expatriated to Mexico in 1958. In Ajijic, Mexico, Thornton remarried, to Guadalajara-native Candelaria Navarro. They had six children together: Walter Jr., Roberta Virginia, Adriana Anabel, Nancy Louella, Richard Orlando and Ethel Ivette. He built a lavish, castle-like home, decorated with intricate mosaic tiling, where he raised his children and lived until his health diminished. He died of a stroke in 1990.

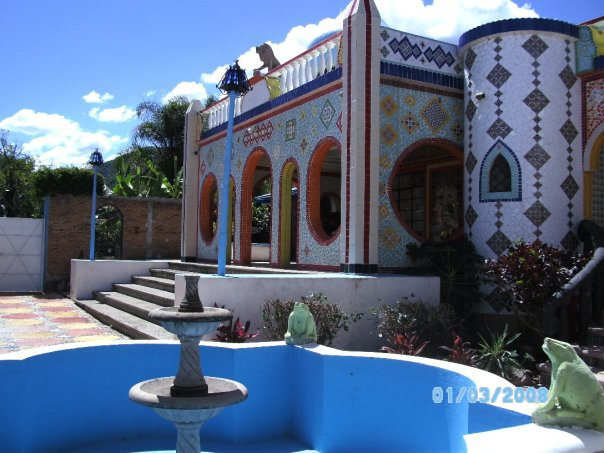
House built and lived in by Walter Clarence Thornton in Ajijic, Mexico

In 2024, Thornton's daughters, Nancy Louella Thornton Navarro and Adriana Anabel Thornton-Cornejo, with Philip Mershon, published a print on demand biography, "The Merchant of Venus: The Life of Walter Thornton".

== Legacy ==
Thornton is famous for two photos, with one foot on the curb and one foot on a running board of a 1929 Chrysler Imperial 75 Roadster, purportedly selling it out of desperation after The Wall Street Stock Market Crash of 1929. There is a large, white, what appears to be cardboard sign on the vehicle that reads "$100 WILL BUY THIS CAR. MUST HAVE CASH. LOST ALL ON THE STOCK MARKET". The Bankrupt Investor image has become emblematic of the 1929 Stock Market Crash.
