= Ajijic =

- Town
- Panoramic view of Ajijic in the background Lake Chapala

- Location within Jalisco Location within Mexico Location within North America
- Coordinates: 20°17′58″N 103°15′29″W
- Country: Mexico
- State: Jalisco
- Municipality: Chapala

Population (2020)
  - Total: 11,439
- Time zone: UTC-6 (Central Standard Time)
- Postal code: 45920

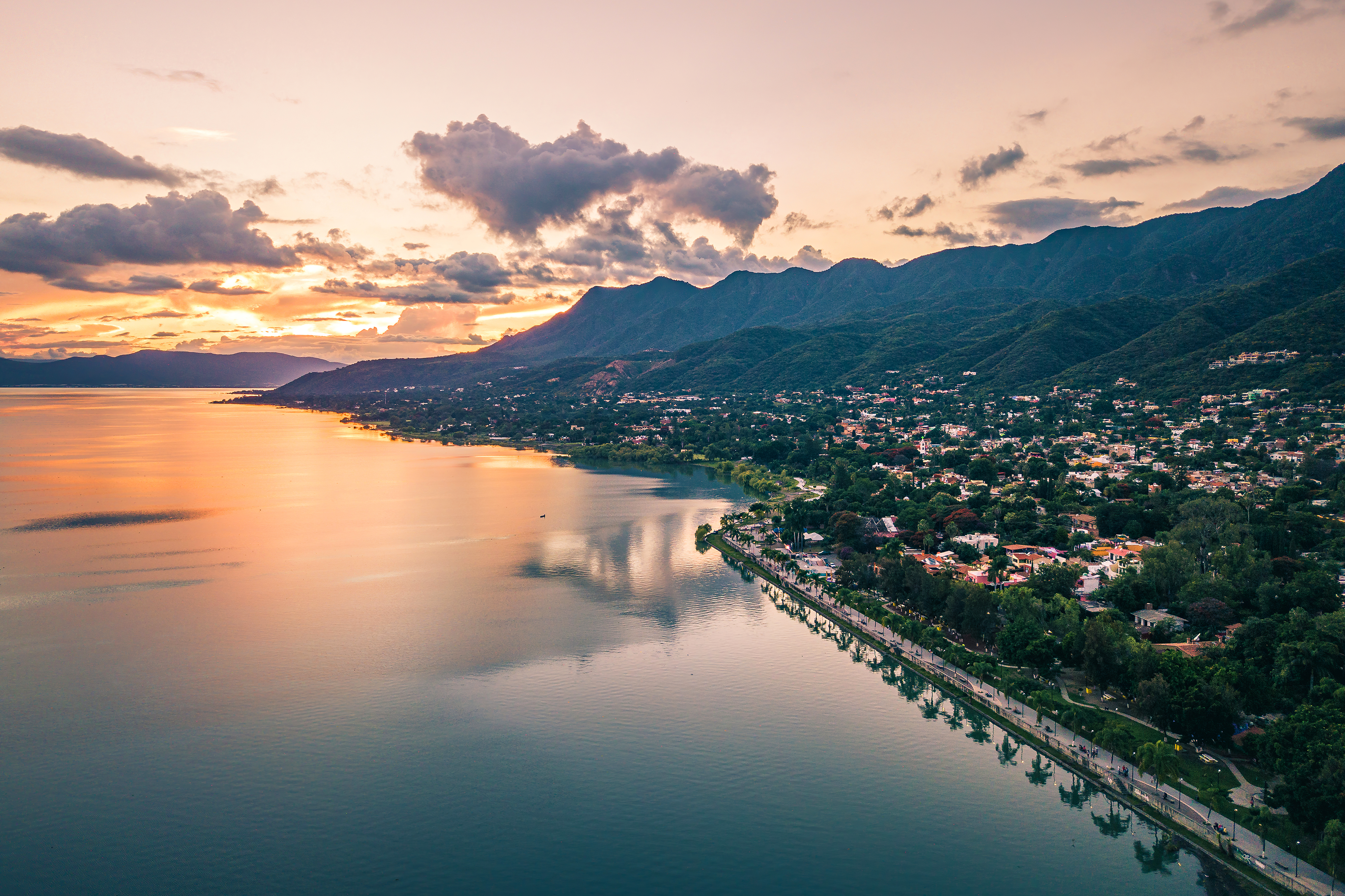
lakeside malecón, Ajijic

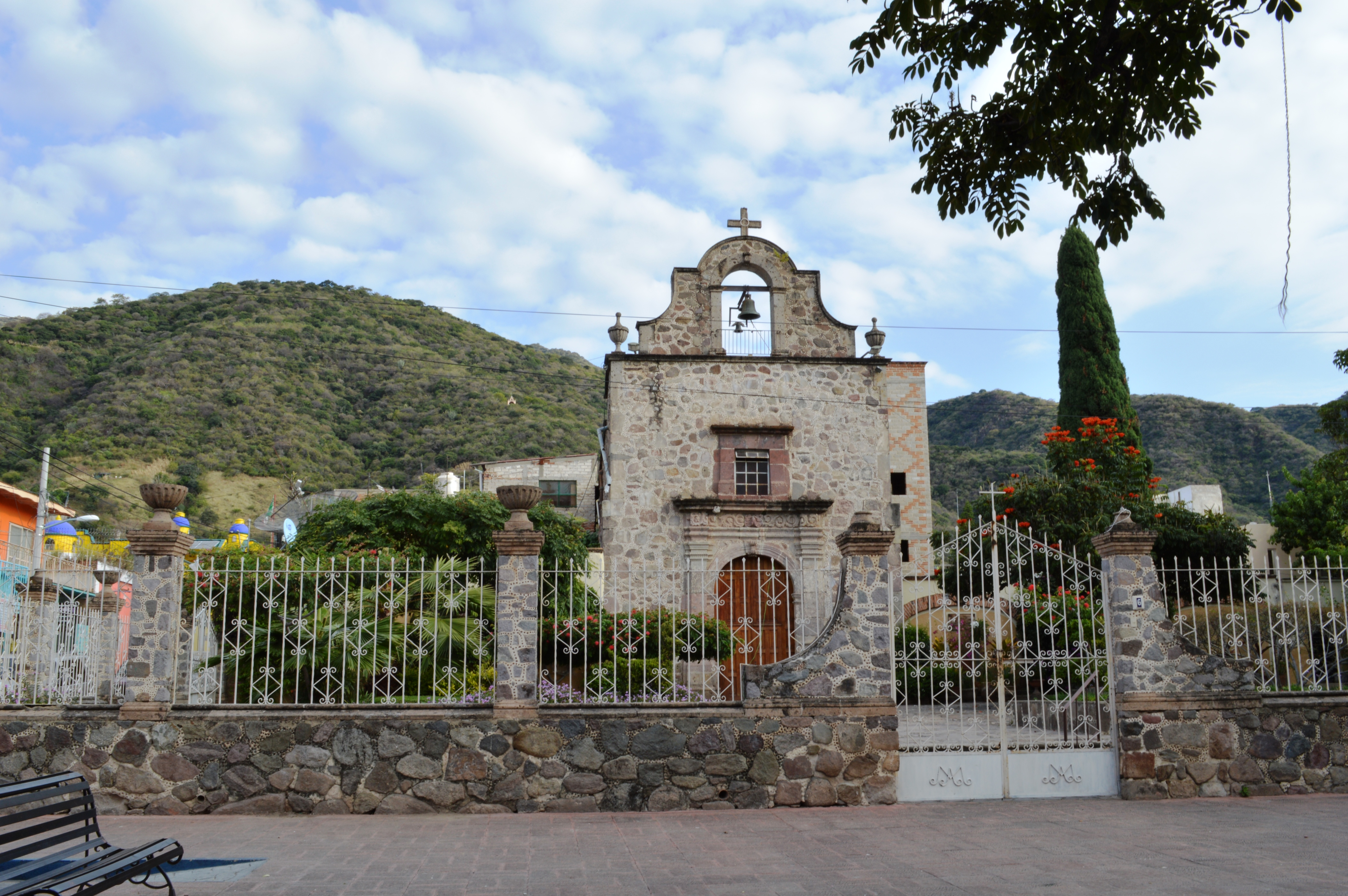
Capilla del Rosario

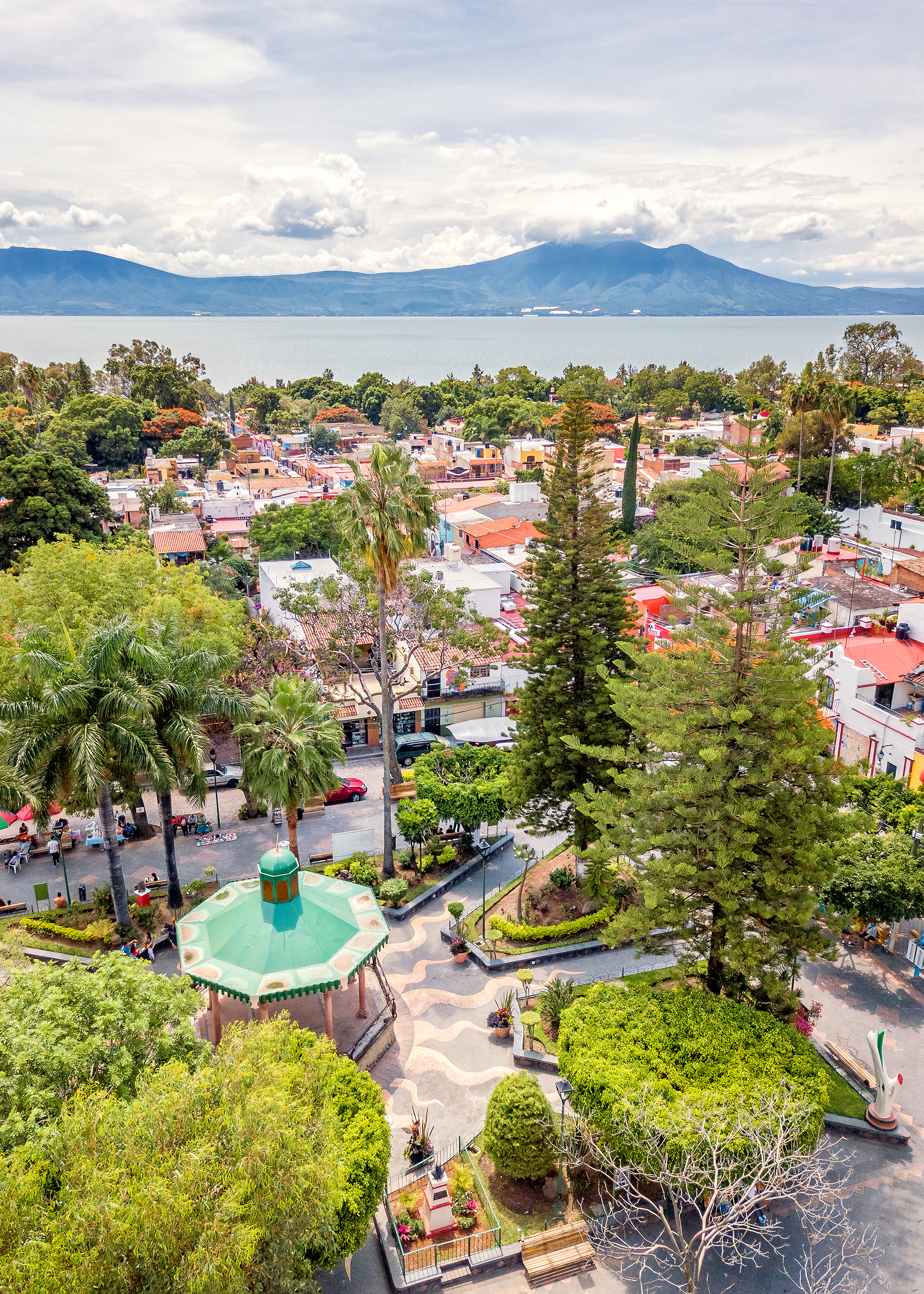
Ajijic's Plaza, towards Lake Chapala

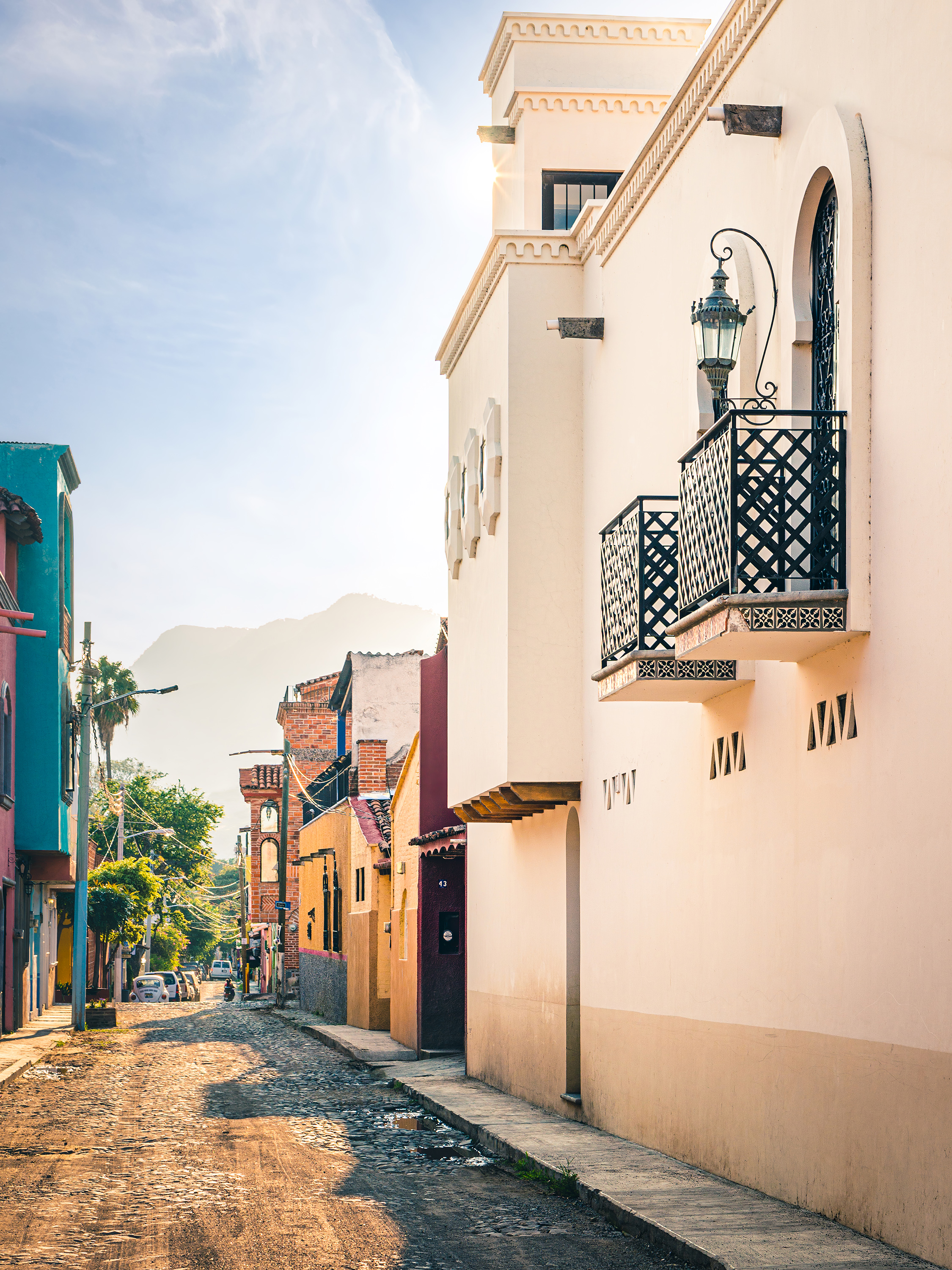
Calle "16 de Septiembre"

Ajijic (Spanish pronunciation: [axiˈxik]) is a town about 5 kilometres (3.1 mi) west of the town of Chapala, part of the municipality (also named Chapala), in the State of Jalisco, Mexico. It is on the north shore of Lake Chapala, surrounded by mountains. Ajijic has a moderate climate year-round. Its population was 11,439 as of the 2020 census.

== Geography ==
Ajijic is 1,538 metres (5,046 ft) above sea level in Mexico's Volcanic Axis, also known as the Trans-Mexican Volcanic Belt.

== Climate ==
The Chapala Lake basin has a year-round average temperature of about 19 °C (66 °F). Due to Ajijic's tropical latitude and relatively high elevation, it is seldom unpleasantly hot or humid. The rainy season is from June to October. The average rainfall is 793 millimetres (31.2 in). Even during the rainy season, precipitation generally occurs during the evening or at night.

December and January are the coolest months, with nighttime lows just above 4 °C (39 °F). May is the hottest, just before the rainy season starts.

Overall, there is very little temperature variation: daytime highs in January are around 24 °C (75 °F), while daytime highs in May range from 27 °C (81 °F) to 32 °C (90 °F).

== History ==
Up until the arrival of the Spanish, the region was occupied by nomadic Native American tribes, probably the Coca people that settled the northern shore. There seem to be many explanations, and meanings for the names Chapala and Ajijic, all of which are Native American place names, probably derived from Nahuatl, the native language of the area.

Ajijic, formerly spelled Axixic, means "place of water" or "place where water bubbles up" in Classical Nahuatl. Don Andres Carlos and Fray Martin founded Ajijic in 1531 because it had a good source of water. It is one of Western Mexico's oldest villages. It is said to have had a population of no more than 2,000 by 1833.

== Tourism ==
Ajijic has attracted foreign artists and writers since the 1890s. Englishmen Nigel Millet and Peter Lilley settled in Ajijic before World War II and under the pen name of Dane Chandos wrote Village in the Sun (1945, G. P. Putnam's Sons), about building a house on the edge of the lake in nearby San Antonio Tlayacapan. Using the same pen name, Lilley later teamed up with Anthony Stansfeld (an English academic) to write House in the Sun (1949), about the operation of a small inn in Ajijic (now known as the "Old Posada"). These books were written when the main road from Chapala was unpaved, ice was delivered by bus from Guadalajara, and electricity was just being installed. Ajijic's population of about 11,000 excludes the hundreds of visitors from Guadalajara (55 kilometres (34 mi) north) who spend weekends and vacations there. Many retired Americans and Canadians live in Ajijic, with an estimate that immigrants make up more than half of the population in the winter.

The local population has received the influx of immigrants with mixed feelings. With the economy more reliant on tourism, many businesses struggled due to the COVID-19 pandemic.

Ajijic celebrates many holidays and special events, with parades about once a month. Ajijic's "Chupinaya Carrera de Montana" attracts about 500 people from all over Mexico each July for a grueling 13.8-kilometer footrace to the summit of Cerro La Chupinaya (2,400 meters, 7,874 feet) and back to the Ajijic Plaza in about 90 minutes for the best runners/climbers. Each September, hundreds attend the unmanned Hot Air Balloon event (Regatta de Globos), where local groups enter their homemade tissue paper balloons, some as big as 200 cubic feet.

The biggest local event of the year is the San Andrés Fiesta, dedicated to Ajijic's patron saint. The Fiesta dominates Ajijic's central plaza and surrounding streets for nine days in November and attracts the majority of Ajijic residents.

In 2020, Ajijic was designated as the ninth Magical Town of Jalisco (Pueblos Mágicos) by the federal ministry of tourism.

== Notable residents ==
- Walter Clarence Thornton
