= Hurricane Willa =

Category 5 Pacific hurricane in 2018

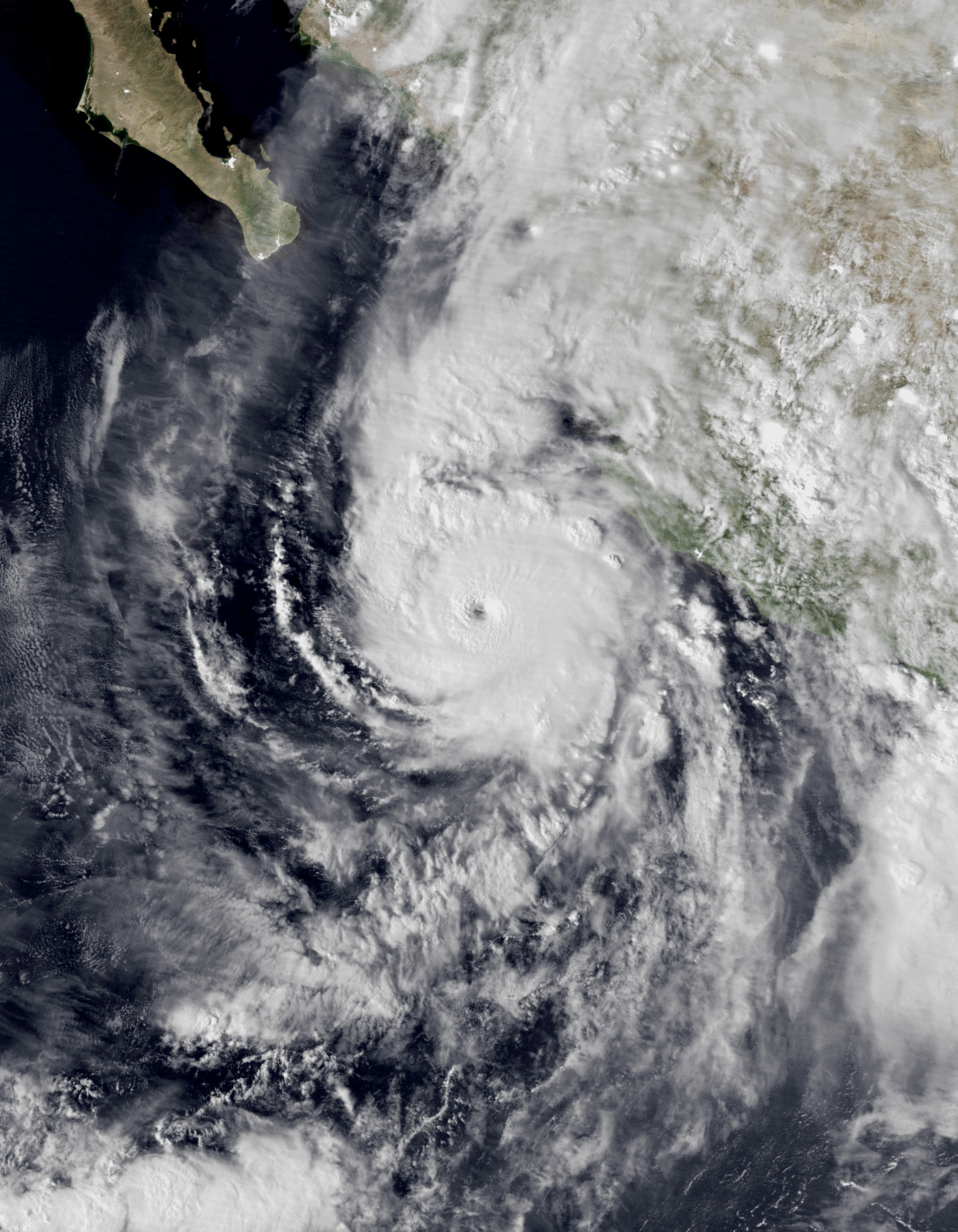
- Willa at peak intensity just west of Jalisco early on October 22

Meteorological history
- Formed: October 20, 2018
- Dissipated: October 24, 2018

Category 5 major hurricane
- 1-minute sustained (SSHWS/NWS)
- Highest winds: 160 mph (260 km/h)
- Lowest pressure: 925 mbar (hPa); 27.32 inHg

Overall effects
- Fatalities: 9 total
- Damage: $825 million (2018 USD)
- Areas affected: Central America, Mexico, Texas
- IBTrACS /
- Part of the 2018 Pacific hurricane season

Hurricane Willa was a powerful tropical cyclone that brought torrential rains and destructive winds to southwestern Mexico, particularly the states of Sinaloa and Nayarit, during late October 2018. It was the twenty-fifth tropical cyclone, twenty-second named storm, thirteenth hurricane, tenth major hurricane, and record-tying third Category 5 hurricane of the 2018 Pacific hurricane season. Willa was the first major hurricane to make landfall in the Mexican state of Sinaloa since Lane in 2006.

Willa originated from a tropical wave that the United States-based National Hurricane Center (NHC) began to monitor for tropical cyclogenesis in the southwestern Caribbean Sea on October 14. However, the system subsequently crossed over Central America into the East Pacific, without significant organization. The NHC continued to track the disturbance until it developed into a tropical depression on October 20, off the coast of southwestern Mexico. The depression strengthened into Tropical Storm Willa later in the day as a period of rapid intensification commenced. Willa peaked as a Category 5 hurricane with sustained winds of 160 mph (260 km/h) on the following day. Afterward, a combination of an eyewall replacement cycle and increasing wind shear weakened the hurricane, and early on October 24, Willa made landfall as a marginal Category 3 hurricane in the Mexican state of Sinaloa. Following landfall, Willa rapidly weakened, dissipating later that day over northeastern Mexico.

Up to its landfall, Willa prompted the issuance of hurricane and tropical storm watches and warnings for western Mexico. The hurricane killed nine people, and caused Mex$16.2 billion (US$825 million) in damage, (Note: All damage totals are listed first in 2018 Mexican pesos, and converted to 2018 United States dollars (US$) via the Federal Reserve Bank of St. Louis.) mostly around the area where it moved ashore. The storm knocked out power to nearly 100,000 people in four states. Willa caused significant damage to many schools, a hospital, and infrastructure in the city of Escuinapa, with totals estimated at Mex$6 billion (US$306 million). The overflow of multiple rivers damaged structures and left many areas in Sinaloa and Nayarit without a supply of potable water. In the surrounding states, flooding and landslides were the main sources of damage and injury. The remnants of Willa later entered the United States and caused flash floods in Texas. After the storm, multiple individuals did not receive direct help from the Mexican government until many months had passed. The victims mainly relied on help from charitable organizations to recover and rebuild their damaged property. The Sinaloa state government delivered rotten mattresses to storm victims and the federal government lost track of funds it had appropriated for relief efforts. Reconstruction was not slated to begin in some areas until a few months after the storm.

== Meteorological history ==
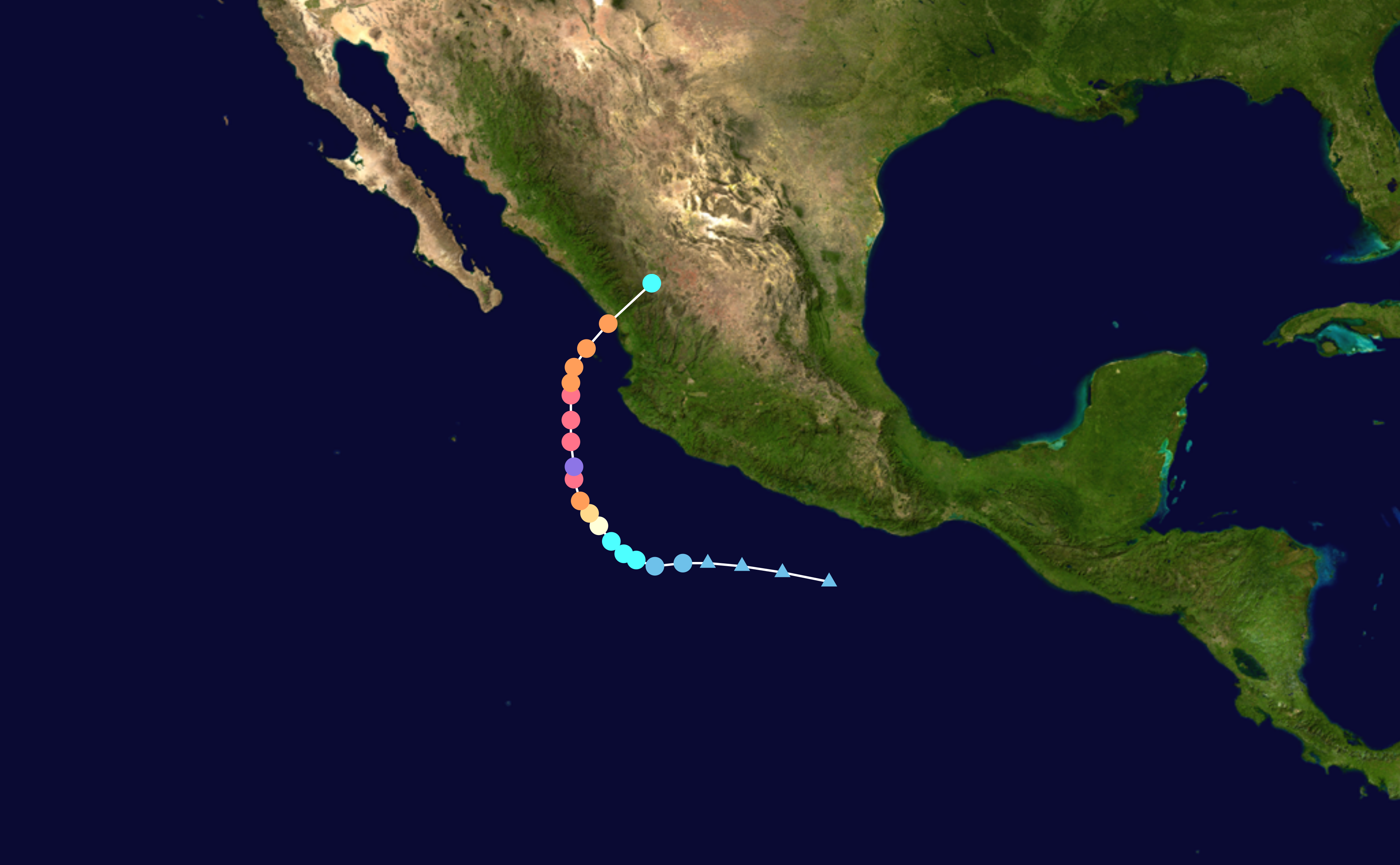
Map plotting the storm's track and intensity, according to the Saffir–Simpson scale Map key Saffir–Simpson scale Tropical depression (≤38 mph, ≤62 km/h) Tropical storm (39–73 mph, 63–118 km/h) Category 1 (74–95 mph, 119–153 km/h) Category 2 (96–110 mph, 154–177 km/h) Category 3 (111–129 mph, 178–208 km/h) Category 4 (130–156 mph, 209–251 km/h) Category 5 (≥157 mph, ≥252 km/h) Unknown Storm type Tropical cyclone Subtropical cyclone Extratropical cyclone, remnant low, tropical disturbance, or monsoon depression

The origins of Hurricane Willa can be traced back to a tropical wave that left the west coast of Africa on October 2, 2018. Over the next few days, the wave produced intermittent bursts of deep convection, or thunderstorms; however, strong wind shear blasted the convection away from the center while the wave traveled westward across the Atlantic Ocean. On October 14, the United States-based National Hurricane Center (NHC) began monitoring the wave for tropical development while it was located in the southwestern Caribbean Sea. On the next day, the system became better organized southeast of the Yucatán Peninsula, and the storm encountered more favorable conditions as it neared land. As a result, a WC-130 aircraft from the United States Air Force Reserve 53rd Weather Reconnaissance Squadron was scheduled to survey the system for further development. However, the wave made landfall in Belize on October 16, hindering further organization.

The tropical wave moved into the East Pacific early on October 17; however, the system failed to coalesce into a tropical cyclone, and became increasingly disorganized and elongated on the next day. A new low-pressure trough, an elongated region of low atmospheric pressure, developed to the east of the original low early on October 19, which organized into Tropical Storm Vicente later that day. The original low to the west gradually organized while moving westward, and at 00:00 UTC on October 20, the system developed into a tropical depression while located approximately 265 mi (426 km) south of Manzanillo, Colima, Mexico. Banding features – significantly elongated, curved bands of rain clouds – began to develop south of the center, while cloud tops west of the center became as cold as −121 to −132 °F (−85 to −91 °C). The system then developed a tight inner core, strengthening into a tropical storm around 12:00 UTC, while located about 290 mi (470 km) south-southwest of Manzanillo. At this point, the NHC assigned it the name Willa from its rotating list of names.

Shortly thereafter, Willa began to rapidly intensify, with its low-level center becoming embedded beneath a central dense overcast, which is the large area of thunderstorms surrounding the storm's circulation center. At the same time, Willa turned towards the northwest as it began traveling around the western edge of a mid-level ridge. Environmental conditions around the cyclone and aloft were favorable, with very low wind shear, high levels of moisture, and sea surface temperatures of 84 °F (29 °C). These conditions allowed Willa to strengthen into a hurricane around 06:00 UTC on October 21. Around the storm, outflow became well-established, and in the center of the convection, a small eye developed. Willa reached Category 3 status by 18:00 UTC, with its eye becoming well-defined on both infrared and satellite imagery, making it the tenth major hurricane of the season. Continuing to rapidly intensify, Willa reached peak intensity as a Category 5 hurricane with maximum sustained winds of 160 mph (260 km/h) and a minimum central pressure of 925 mbar (27.3 inHg) at approximately 06:00 UTC on October 22, while located about 195 mi (314 km) south-southwest of Cabo Corrientes, Mexico. This capped off a 48-hour period in which Willa's winds increased by 125 mph (201 km/h). (Note: Operationally, Willa was reported as having intensified by 120 mph (195 km/h) to a high-end Category 4 hurricane in 48 hours, but the timing of the system's peak intensity was adjusted in the post-storm reanalysis.) Over the next few days, Willa recurved towards Mexico; the system turned to the north as it rounded the edge of the ridge and later to the northeast due to an approaching mid-to-upper-level trough.

Shortly after Willa reached peak intensity, microwave satellite imagery detected the presence of an outer eyewall, indicating that Willa was beginning to undergo an eyewall replacement cycle. Willa also began to interact with the smaller Tropical Storm Vicente to the southeast at about this time. Despite a favorable environment, Willa began to weaken due to the eyewall replacement cycle, with the storm's eye becoming cloud-filled; Willa weakened to Category 3 strength on October 23 around 06:00 UTC, as southwesterly wind shear began to increase. The weakening trend abated as the eyewall replacement cycle ended, and Willa's eye passed over Isla San Juanito and Isla María Madre at approximately 17:45 UTC. The system made landfall as a Category 3 hurricane near Palmito del Verde, Sinaloa, at 01:20 UTC on October 24 (7:20 PM MDT on October 23), with 1-minute sustained winds of 115 mph (185 km/h) and a minimum central pressure of 968 mbar (28.6 inHg). This made it the first Pacific major hurricane to strike Mexico since Hurricane Patricia in 2015, and the first landfalling major hurricane in Sinaloa since Hurricane Lane in 2006. Willa's eye soon faded away on satellite imagery as it progressed inland. Following landfall, mountainous terrain and southwesterly wind shear took a toll on the storm's strength, and Willa rapidly weakened, degenerating into a tropical storm by 06:00 UTC. Six hours later, Willa dissipated over northeastern Mexico, with the mid- and upper-level circulations decoupling from the lower-level circulation. The remnants of Willa continued to travel northeastward, bringing rain to multiple states in the United States. Energy from the remnants contributed to the formation of a nor'easter in the eastern United States.

== Preparations ==
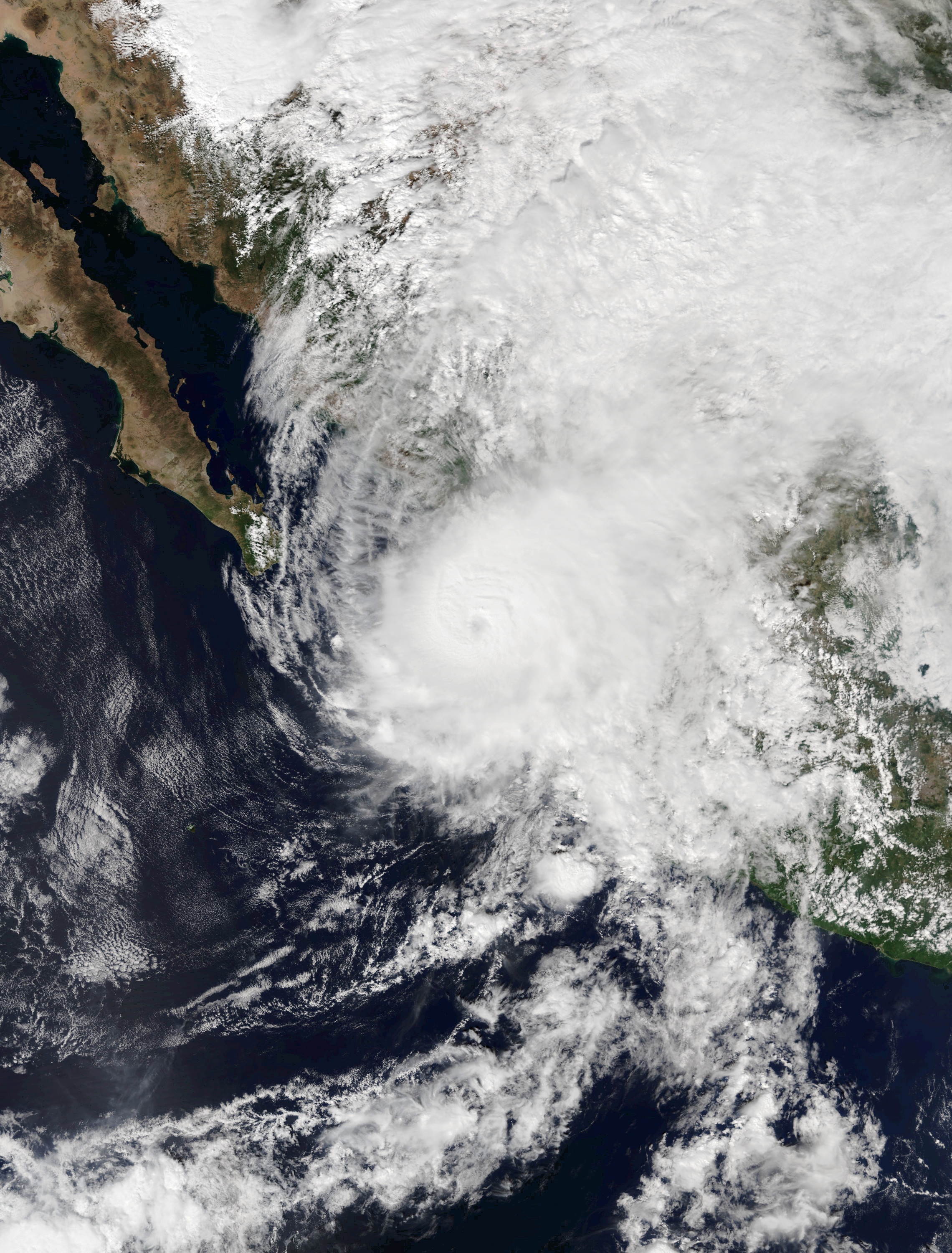
Hurricane Willa nearing landfall in Sinaloa on October 23.

The Government of Mexico issued a hurricane watch on October 21 at 15:00 UTC for the western coast of Mexico from San Blas to Mazatlán, and a tropical storm watch from Playa Perula to San Blas. Six hours later, a tropical storm watch was issued for Mazatlán to Bahía Tempehuaya. The hurricane watch and tropical storm watches were replaced with warnings at 03:00 UTC on October 22. All warnings were discontinued at 06:00 UTC on October 24 after Willa weakened to a tropical storm over Durango.

Various other weather-related alerts were issued as Willa approached Mexico's Pacific coast. Red alerts, indicative of the maximum level of danger, were issued for portions of Nayarit and Sinaloa in Willa's direct path. In central Sinaloa and Puerto Vallarta, Jalisco, orange alerts were issued due to high danger. A majority of Chihuahua was under a yellow alert, meaning moderate danger, due to the threat of heavy rainfall. A green alert, signaling minimal danger, was issued for Baja California Sur as a precautionary measure due to waves along the coast. Admiral Vidal Francisco Soberón Sanz of the Mexican Secretariat of the Navy activated the Prevention Phase of the Marine Plan, a military disaster preparation and relief plan, in the states of Sonora, Sinaloa, Nayarit, Jalisco, Colima, and Michoacán. Small vessels were restricted in the ports of Comondú, La Paz, and Los Cabos as well as in the Gulf of California and Sea of Cortez. Classes were canceled in the Sinaloan municipalities of Concordia, Cosalá, Elota, Escuinapa, Mazatlán, Rosario, and San Ignacio. Approximately 1,265 schools were also closed along the northern and southern coasts of Jalisco.

Approximately 200,000 people were evacuated from their homes in Nayarit and Sinaloa. About 40,000 of those people utilized more than 2,900 shelters, assisted by the Mexican Army, Navy, and emergency crews. Businesses and industries in the storm's path closed. Mazatlán International Airport closed during the storm, as did nearby hotels. Thirty neighborhoods in the municipality of Mazatlán were evacuated due to the risk of flooding. Emergency authorities evicted over 4,250 people in coastal cities from their homes and established 58 shelters before the storm hit. In Jalisco, 2,500 people were evacuated ahead of Willa and 23 temporary shelters were established. At least 6,000 people were evacuated from Escuinapa due to the proximity of Willa. Fonden, Mexico's natural disaster relief agency, allocated 99.2 US tons (90 metric tons) of food for affected people in advance of Willa's landfall. The Mexican Navy set up a collection center for food and supplies in La Paz, Baja California Sur, in the hours before the storm.

Hurricane Willa and Tropical Storm Vicente together forced the Norwegian Bliss cruise ship to divert to San Diego, California, on October 23. Despite the threat that Willa posed, Petróleos Mexicanos, the state-owned petroleum company, announced that it intended to maintain normal operations in Jalisco, Nayarit, Colima, Sonora and Sinaloa. All economic activity and public transportation were suspended in Sinaloa as a precaution. Roads and businesses were closed in Nayarit, with officials requesting that citizens remain in their homes. In order to prevent damage to water pumping equipment during the storm, service was shut off to 27 neighborhoods in Tepic, Nayarit, on October 23. The Jalisco state Ministry of Communications and Transportation (SCT) employed 400 people to observe 322 bridges and over 1,365 mi (2,197 km) of roads. The SCT also readied 60 machines, including backhoes, in case of landslides. The number of road crews available was increased from 22 to 40 during the storm.

== Impact ==
=== Mexico ===
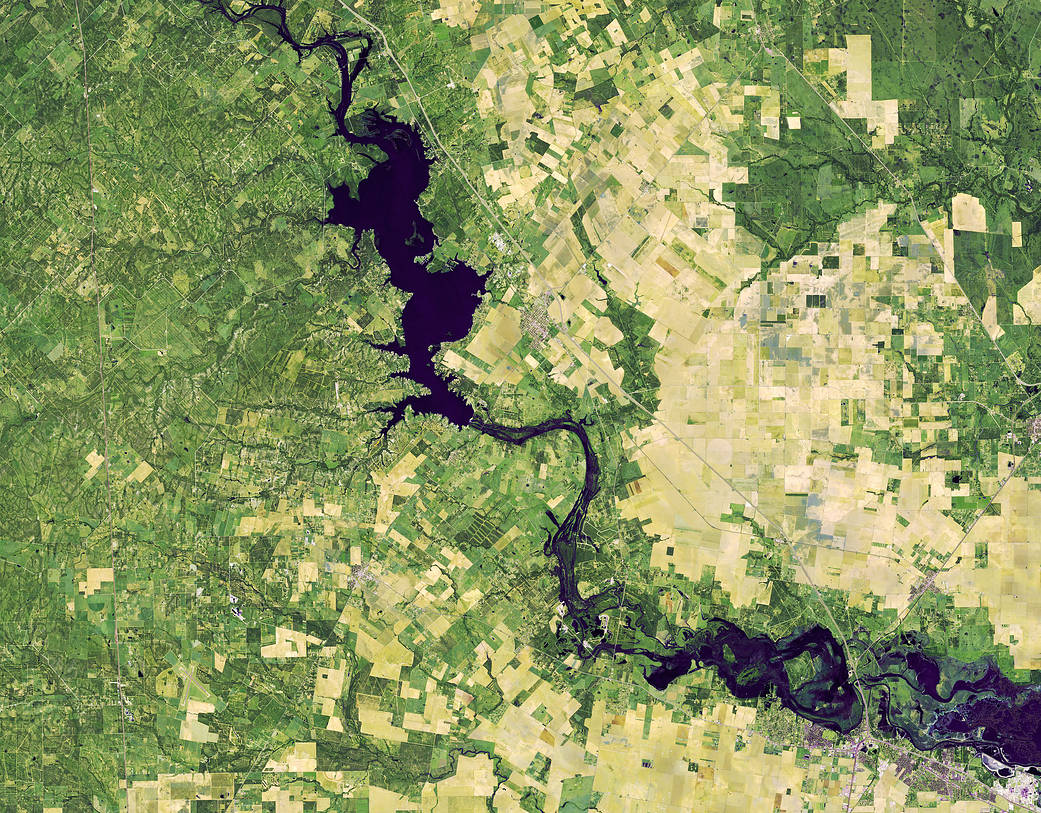
Landsat image of the Nueces River overflowing its banks, November 1, 2018.

The eye of Hurricane Willa crossed over two of the offshore Islas Marías, producing wind gusts of 112 mph (180 km/h), and average sustained winds of 89 mph (143 km/h) for a 15-minute period; the latter value equated to 1-minute sustained winds of around 100 mph (160 km/h). The Marías Islands Prison was damaged during the storm; palm trees were uprooted, roofs collapsed, and barbed wire was ripped from fences.

On the Mexican mainland, storm chasers from iCyclone reported a minimum pressure of 968 mbar (28.6 inHg) where Willa's eye moved ashore, suggesting a landfall intensity of 115 mph (185 km/h). Willa produced hurricane-force wind gusts as well as high waves and a significant storm surge in the immediate vicinity of where it moved ashore. Willa dropped heavy rainfall in western Mexico, peaking at 15.39 in (391 mm) in San Andrés Milpillas in northern Nayarit. Cihuatlán in western Jalisco reported 13.17 in (335 mm) of rainfall. Intense precipitation occurred in six Mexican states – Colima, Durango, Jalisco, Michoacán, Nayarit, and Sinaloa. The storm left 96,200 people without power in four states: Sinaloa, where it moved ashore, as well as Nayarit, Durango, and Michoacán.

==== Sinaloa ====
Hurricane Willa's landfall in Sinaloa left two municipalities isolated – Escuinapa and Rosario. High winds damaged homes and knocked down trees, which blocked roads. In Escuinapa, the storm damaged the general hospital, causing part of the roof and walls to collapse. Soldiers evacuated 35 patients from the hospital. The city also experienced power outages and had no potable water. Damage in the city was estimated at Mex$6 billion (US$306 million). Willa severely damaged 72 schools in Escuinapa and 19 in Rosario. Approximately 17,000 ha (42,000 acres) of crops were damaged across seven municipalities.

The Trébol II community dam was damaged as a result of floodwaters from Willa. Power lines were knocked down along a road to Tecapan, causing the entire town to lose power. In Rosario, the Baluarte River rapidly rose after at least 188 mm (7.4 in) of rain fell, sweeping away stone extraction machinery and transportation trucks. The destruction of infrastructure left multiple communities in Rosario without drinking water and at least 53 km (33 mi) of unusable roads. The river flood also damaged approximately 3,000 ha (12 sq mi) of crops in Rosario. In Mazatlán, heavy rainfall caused rockslides and increased the water level of the Camarón lagoon.

==== Nayarit ====
Costliest Pacific hurricanes
Rank	Cyclone	Season	Damage	Ref
1	5 Otis	2023	$12–16 billion	
2	1 Manuel	2013	$4.2 billion	
3	4 Iniki	1992	$3.1 billion	
4	3 John	2024	$2.45 billion	
5	4 Odile	2014	$1.82 billion	
6	TS Agatha	2010	$1.1 billion	
7	4 Hilary	2023	$948 million	
8	5 Willa	2018	$825 million	
9	1 Madeline	1998	$750 million	
10	2 Rosa	1994	$700 million	

In the state of Nayarit, Willa inflicted at least Mex$10 billion (US$510 million) in damage. A state of emergency was declared for 12 municipalities. The hurricane left about 100,000 people homeless statewide. A hydro-agricultural system in the northern part of the state was damaged, resulting in Mex$700 million (US$35.7 million) in losses. Heavy rainfall caused rivers to crest more than 11 m (36 ft) above normal, forcing the municipalities of Tecuala, Acaponeta, Tuxpan, San Blas, and Huajicori to be evacuated. A total of 12,000 people were forced into shelters statewide.

Heavy rain from Willa led to severe flooding along the San Pedro River and the Acaponeta River, affecting 180,000 people. Four people drowned along the San Pedro River – three in Huajicori, and one in San Vicente in Tuxpan. The only road to the El Valle de la Urraca community was washed out, leaving its inhabitants without outside communication. Strong winds and floodwaters wiped out local shrimp farms. One farmer lost 22.0–33.1 US tons (20–30 metric tons) or about Mex$2 million (US$82,000). In Tuxpan, the overflow of the San Pedro River caused sewage leaks. Three out of four of the municipality's public schools suffered major flood damage; another 42 schools in the state of Nayarit experienced considerable damage. Tens of thousands of individuals in the municipality experienced flooding up to 2 m (6.6 ft) in height. The flooding from the rivers also caused a shortage of potable water in the northern portion of the state; water service was not restored for at least two weeks after the end of the storm. The municipal government lost 2.2 US tons (2 metric tons) of food aid after the warehouse the food was stored in was flooded. Firefighters worked overnight to rescue people trapped on their roofs.

Acaponeta was similarly severely impacted as record-breaking flooding occurred along the Acaponeta River, with a flood crest of 12.20 m (40.0 ft) and peak discharge of 17,000 m^{3}/s (600,000 cu ft/s) recorded. Several vehicles were trapped by floodwaters along Federal Highway 68, particularly at the Acaponeta toll booth. Civil Protection and Mexican Navy personnel conducted at least 80 land and water rescues. Flooding also forced the closure of Federal Highway 15D between Acaponeta and La Guásima.

==== Elsewhere ====
Willa brought heavy rains and flooding to parts of Michoacán, causing streams and rivers to overflow. The Cointzio Dam reached 98% capacity, and water and sewage systems in the state capital, Morelia, reached full capacity. Waters reached 1 m (3.3 ft) deep in some parts of the capital, which inundated 40 neighborhoods and entered hundreds of homes. The Jacarandas neighborhood had to be evacuated due to odor from the sewage system. Three shelters were set up to house affected city residents. Damage in Morelia was estimated at Mex$35 million (US$1.79 million). In Atapaneo, a landslide caused a freight train to derail, injuring two people. Rains from the storms raised water levels on Lake Chapala.

Strong waves from Willa overturned a boat; two brothers drowned off the coast of Colima while scattering a relative's ashes. The bodies were recovered by local officials and the Mexican Navy. Due to the unsettled weather produced by Willa and the nearby Tropical Storm Vicente, numerous oil tankers were unable to unload fuel at ports in Manzanillo and Tuxpan. Combined with the closure of a major pipeline that transports petroleum to Guadalajara, this caused a fuel shortage in Jalisco, with some 500 gas stations being affected.

Heavy rains in neighboring Jalisco flooded streets and overflowed streams. In Melaque, infantry soldiers evacuated their headquarters when it flooded. Strong currents broke a fence for a crocodile habitat in La Manzanilla, allowing hundreds to escape. At least a dozen houses in Punta Pérula were flooded with up to 60 cm (24 in) of water. Strong waves occurred off the coast of Puerto Vallarta; landslides and fallen trees were also reported there. Heavy rainfall killed two people in Nogales, Sonora, where floods also swept away cars and entered homes and businesses. The Papaloapan and Coatzacoalcos Rivers in Veracruz overflowed their banks due to the excessive rainfall.

In the municipality of Mezquital in the state of Durango, a power worker was shocked and fell to his death amid the storm's heavy rainfall. At least five towns flooded in the state. Landslides in Pueblo Nuevo municipality, Durango, damaged 35 homes across 10 rural communities. The Durango-Mazatlán highway was partially closed from October 23–24. Schools across the state were also canceled until October 25. Losses in Lerdo, Durango, reached about Mex$140 million (US$7.14 million). A total of 200 people were evacuated from the area surrounding the Santa Elena dam due to overflowing water.

A total of ten landslides occurred in the state of Hidalgo as a result of heavy rainfall from Willa and the nearby Tropical Storm Vicente. In municipalities of the Huasteca and Sierra regions, highway accesses were blocked by boulders and tree limbs. Two people were hospitalized due to a landslide in Zacualtipán. Seven people were evacuated after a house was buried in Calnali. Roads in Huehuetla and Tenango were impassable due to landslides. Landslides affected the Tlanchinol-Hueyapa state highway in Tepehuacán, the Pachuca-Huejutla highway in the municipality of Mineral del Chico, and the Mexico City–Tampico federal highway.

=== United States ===
On October 24, the remnants of Hurricane Willa brought heavy rainfall and thunderstorms to the U.S. states of Texas and Louisiana. The area had already been saturated from excessive rainfall within the past month. A Flash Flood Warning was issued for Galveston County, in southeastern Texas. Rainfall reached 4.9 in (120 mm) at the Scholes International Airport at Galveston; this broke the city's daily rainfall record, surpassing the previous record set in 1883. Flash flooding from the rains collected in bayous, covering streets and flooding some cars. Floodwaters entered the dorms at the Texas A&M University at Galveston.

Further east, renmants of Willa's moisture helped fuel a nor'easter in the Northeastern United States. The storm resulted in suspensions on the Long Beach Branch of the Long Island Rail Road and closures on parts of FDR Drive in New York. Ferries between Long Island and Connecticut were also suspended during the storm. Orient Beach State Park was closed as the only access road was destroyed during the nor'easter, and remained closed until January 31, 2019.

== Aftermath ==
Mexican authorities sent 45,000 people to assist with relief efforts. Included in this group were soldiers, sailors, doctors, and nurses. Plan DN-III-E, a disaster relief and rescue plan, was activated in the states of Colima, Durango, Jalisco, Nayarit, and Sinaloa. About 11,000 soldiers were deployed in the municipalities of Culiacán, El Rosario, Escuinapa, Elota, and Mazatlán in Sinaloa to help with transporting civilians to four shelters. In Sinaloa, approximately 1,820 people were provided with 1,400 food rations. Soldiers also worked to repair window damage at the Teacapan Hospital as well as remove trees from roads. Around 590 soldiers were deployed in Durango. In Colima, 262 soldiers were deployed to monitor the level of the Marabasco River. In Michoacán, officials mobilized 500 soldiers to help families impacted by the hurricane. One hundred and eighteen soldiers evacuated 154 people in the cities of Melaque, Puerto Vallarta, and Tomatlán in Jalisco. The government of Mexico City established a collection center for food, cleaning products, and hygiene products; this center was located in Mexico City's Pushkin Garden. About 3,000 meals were distributed by the Mexican Army in a community kitchen in Tuxpan, Nayarit, as a part of Plan DN-III-E. The National System for Integral Family Development (DIF) sent 1,764 US tons (1,600 metric tons) of aid, including pantries, galvanized sheet metal, and bottled water, to areas affected by Willa.

The Marine Plan was activated in Sinaloa and Nayarit, resulting in the dispatch of 1,800 soldiers, 163 vehicles, 8 aircraft, 15 surface units, 6 ships, and 3 mobile kitchens. The Mexican Red Cross sent 48,502 US tons (44,000 metric tons) of supplies to Nayarit and Sinaloa; the aid delivered to Nayarit pantries consisted of 19,842 US tons (18,000 metric tons), including a thousand hygiene kits. Approximately 28,660 US tons (26,000 metric tons) of goods were sent to Sinaloa pantries. Additionally, collection centers were opened in Sinaloa, Nayarit, Jalisco, and Guanajuato. Around 178 people were evacuated from Cristo Rey and El Rosario in Escuinapa. Soldiers distributed 500 food portions using a mobile kitchen in the Nayarit municipality of Tecuala. The Tuxpan municipal government provided 1,400 US tons (1,270 metric tons) of food, water, supplies, clothing, and medicine to affected individuals. Officials in Nayarit sent 76 vehicles with medical supplies to reach the most affected residents in northern Nayarit. The Jalisco State Civil Fire and Protection Unit used aquatic vehicles to transport supplies to the Tuxpan Municipality and assess damage in Nayarit. For one week, officials made Federal Highway 15D – a toll road – free of charge, and instead collected more than Mex$1.1 million (US$57,000) in donations for the residents left homeless by the hurricane. The office of the Attorney General of the Republic sent 12.1 US tons (11 metric tons) of food as well as four doctors and 500 kg (1,100 lb) of medicine to Sinaloa and Nayarit. Save the Children sent 800 hygiene kits to children in Nayarit. They also were operating 17 dining facilities for nearly 3,000 children, but were forced to close four located in Isla del Bosque, Escuinapa, and Teacapán due to power outages.

Petróleos Mexicanos reported gasoline shortages in the state of Guanajuato following Hurricane Willa. The shortages were blamed on infrastructural damage and an increase in fuel theft caused by Willa. The unloading of fuel was not possible in some ports. Additionally, gasoline pipelines had to be shut down due to theft; the Tula-Salamanca section was closed for repairs as a result of damage left by thieves.

Sinaloa Governor Quirino Ordaz Coppel declared a state of emergency for seven municipalities. Argentine footballer Diego Maradona, then coach of the Dorados de Sinaloa, hosted a charity dinner on November 5 to provide financial support for individuals affected by Willa and Tropical Depression Nineteen-E.

In Nayarit, the National Civil Protection Coordination designated the municipalities of Acaponeta, El Nayar, Huajicori, Rosamorada, Ruiz, Santiago Ixcuintla, Tecuala, and Tuxpan as disaster areas. In the municipality of Escuinapa in Sinaloa, it was reported that over 2,000 families were living under plastic roofs six months after the storm. Additionally, Mayor Emmet Soto Grave stated that there were many irregularities in the damage reported by the previous government. In total, 144 houses had been counted as damaged by the government from October 23–28, while more than 2,000 were actually affected. After President Andrés Manuel López Obrador had federal officials visit the city, more inaccuracies regarding damage to roads, educational institutions, and areas of tourism were discovered. In the time after Willa's dissipation, the National Water Commission reported that the Baluarte River had seen a major increase in chromium, mercury, and nickel concentrations a month after the storm. Throughout the region, mango orchards were severely damaged by wind gusts from Willa, resulting in a 50–75% decrease in production. This decrease equated to a loss of about 77,162 US tons (70,000 metric tons) or 13,300 ha (32,900 acres) of mango. At least 1,200 farmers required loans due to significant losses. The mayor of Mazatlán sent 60 workers, two cranes, and three dump trucks to Escuinapa. Several months after the storm, the communities of Maloya and Buenavista in El Rosario were mostly without potable water.

During the first week after the storm, at least 180,000 people had no outside communication or food as a result of the flood of the San Pedro and Acaponeta rivers. Some people had to rid their entire house of river mud without assistance. Those affected by Willa in Nayarit said they felt "abandoned by the authorities" after only receiving help from disaster organizations for the month and a half following the storm. Schools in Tuxpan did not have classes during that time as the facilities were unusable. The town of Los Sandovales in Acaponeta was destroyed, resulting in many of the families there becoming homeless. In the weeks after Willa, the state government of Nayarit announced that it was unable to provide funds towards reconstruction as a result of the state's bankruptcy. In 2019, the Mexican Government announced that it would provide Mex$250 million (US$10.4 million) for the reconstruction of Nayarit municipalities, which was slated to begin in February. Approximately Mex$23.19 million (US$961,000) in federal relief funds were distributed to the municipalities of Tuxpan, Rosamorada, Tecuala, Acaponeta, and Huajicori; 533 families in these municipalities were awarded Mex$30,000 (US$1,250) to cover damage to their homes. Two federal officials gave another 30 families Mex$120,000 (US$5,000) after their homes were completely destroyed. The federal government also allocated Mex$2 billion (US$83.6 million) for the reconstruction of public infrastructure, such as highways, bridges, schools, and hospitals. The cost to repair public infrastructure in Nayarit was evaluated at approximately Mex$2.2 billion (US$92 million); it also was estimated that Mex$39 million (US$1.6 million) was required to cover the costs of mud removal from main roads in the state. Coppel, a nationwide department store, was given Mex$66 million (US$2.8 million) by the federal government; this allowed Coppel to provide 4,400 families with Mex$15,000 (US$625) vouchers for furniture and appliances. In Sinaloa, people used their own funds to rebuild their homes due to lack of resources from Fonden. The state delivered Mex$2 million (US$101,000) worth of rotten mattresses to victims and allowed them access to pantries in exchange for support letters. Support ranging between Mex$1,800–10,000 (US$90–$500) was provided to small businesses. A Sinaloan state official said that it could take three years for Fonden to allocate funds for repairs. Fonden had authorized a total of Mex$84.7 million (US$4.3 million) to cover damage resulting from Willa; however, no repair work had commenced in the months after the storm and the whereabouts of the funds were unknown. A few days after President López Obrador's tour of Sinaloa, including the city of Mazatlán, Fonden allotted Mex$510 million (US$23.9 million) for damage in Escuinapa and El Rosario.

== See also ==
- Weather of 2018
- Tropical cyclones in 2018
- List of Category 5 Pacific hurricanes
- Hurricane Olivia (1975) – Category 3 hurricane that took a similar track and struck Sinaloa
- Hurricane Tico (1983) – Took a similar track and made landfall near Mazatlán as a strong Category 3 hurricane
- Hurricane Kenna (2002) – Category 5 hurricane that took a similar track and underwent rapid intensification, before making landfall in Nayarit as a Category 4 hurricane
- Hurricane Rick (2009) – Category 5 hurricane that took a similar track and underwent rapid intensification, before making landfall in Sinaloa as a tropical storm
- Hurricane Patricia (2015) – The strongest Pacific hurricane on record, with winds of 215 mph (346 km/h); took a similar track and made landfall in Jalisco as a strong Category 4 hurricane
- Hurricane Otis (2023) – First known East Pacific hurricane to have made landfall at Category 5 intensity
