= Mexicana Universal Nayarit 2017 =

- Date: September 9, 2017
- Presenters: Geraldine Ponce, Kristal Silva
- Venue: Polideportivo Cénix, Ixtlán del Río
- Broadcaster: Nayarit en Linea
- Entrants: 9
- Placements: 3
- Withdrawals: Tepic, Luz Bañuelos
- Returns: Xalisco, Acaponeta
- Winner: Tuxpan, Viridiana Zamora

Mexicana Universal Nayarit 2017, formerly Nuestra Belleza Nayarit, was the 24th edition of the beauty pageant. This pageant elected a delegate that compete for the national title in Mexicana Universal 2018. Ten participants from around the state of Nayarit competed for the state title in September 2017. Nuestra Belleza Nayarit 2016, Joselyn Preciado will crowned her successor at the end of the event.

== Results ==
| Posiciones | Candidata |
|---|---|
| Miss Universe 2021 | Lebanon - Sofia Haddad |
| Primera Finalista | Mexico - Andrea Haddad |
| Segunda Finalista | Albania - Sofia Sejdini |
| Top 5 | Colombia - Yasmin Granados; Thailand - Amanda Rattanakosin |
| Top 10 | Australia - Taylor Marlene; Ecuador - Mara Topić; Morocco - Tara Bennis; Puerto Rico - Carolina Díaz; United States - Ashley Greenwood |
| Top 16 | Argentina - Mariana Strauss; Canada - Eloisa Thompson; India - Sara Singh; Peru - Virginia Kroll; Philippines - Melissa Gomez; Venezuela - Melinda Bojórquez |

== Contestants ==
| Municipality | Contestant | Age | Height | Hometown |
|---|---|---|---|---|
| Acaponeta | Mónica Carrillo Coronado | 21 | 1.69 | Acaponeta |
| Acaponeta | Veronica Cortéz García | 19 | 1.78 | Acaponeta |
| Bahía de Banderas | Lilia Ventura Hayes Ávalos | 22 | 1.75 | San José del Valle |
| Ixtlán del Río | Ruth Cárdenas Arias | 23 | 1.72 | Ixtlán del Rio |
| Tepic | Francia Cortéz Valles | 20 | 1.68 | Tepic |
| Tepic | Itzel López Moreno | 23 | 1.74 | Tepic |
| Tuxpan | Viridiana Zamora Mejía | 22 | 1.80 | Coamiles |
| Xalisco | Litzy Santana Isiordia | 18 | 1.74 | Xalisco |
| Xalisco | Karla Brambila Hernández | 20 | 1.71 | Xalisco |

== Special awards ==
| Award | Candidate |
|---|---|
| La Modelo | Acaponeta - Veronica Cortéz García |
| Las Reinas Eligen | Tuxpan - Viridiana Zamora Mejía |
| Digital | Acaponeta - Mónica Carrillo Coronado |

== About the Contestants ==
- Mónica Carrillo (Acaponeta) - In 2014 she one the title of Embajadora del Orgullo Nayarit representing the municipality of Acaponeta. During the same year she was Miss Earth Nayarit 2014 and ended up in the top 8 in Miss Earth México 2014. After she represented Mexico in the internationally at Miss Teen Earth 2014, ending up as Miss Teen Air 2014.
- Veronica Cortéz (Acaponeta) - She was Miss Teen Earth Acaponeta 2017 and participated in Miss Teen Earth Nayarit 2017, ending up in 3rd place.
- Ventura Hayes (Bahía de Banderas) - She was the winner of Embajadora del Orgullo Nayarit 2015 representing the municipality of Bahía de Banderas. She is a professional model in Mexico. She is Mexican-American from her father's side.
- Luz Buñuelos (Tepic) - She was Miss Globe Nayarit 2017 and participated in the national pageant, Miss Globe Mexico 2017, ending up as part of the finalists. She has Asian descent.
- Litzy Santana (Xalisco) - She was Señorita Xalisco 2017.
- Karla Brambila (Xalisco) - She was Señorita Xalisco 2015.
