= Manuel Humberto Cota Jiménez =

Mexican politician (born 1961)

Member of the Chamber of Deputies for Nayarit′s 1st district
- In office 1 September 2009 – 31 August 2012
- Preceded by: Sergio González García
- Succeeded by: Juan Manuel Rocha Piedra

Personal details
- Born: 2 March 1961 (age 65) Tepic, Nayarit, Mexico
- Party: PRI
- Education: Autonomous University of Nayarit
- Occupation: Politician

Manuel Humberto Cota Jiménez (born 2 March 1961) is a Mexican politician affiliated with the Institutional Revolutionary Party (PRI). He served as a senator for Nayarit in the 62nd Congress (2012–2015) and as a member of the Chamber of Deputies for Nayarit's first district in the 61st Congress (2009–2012).

He also served as a local deputy in the Congress of Nayarit and as municipal president of Tepic.
