= Acaponeta River =

River in Mexico

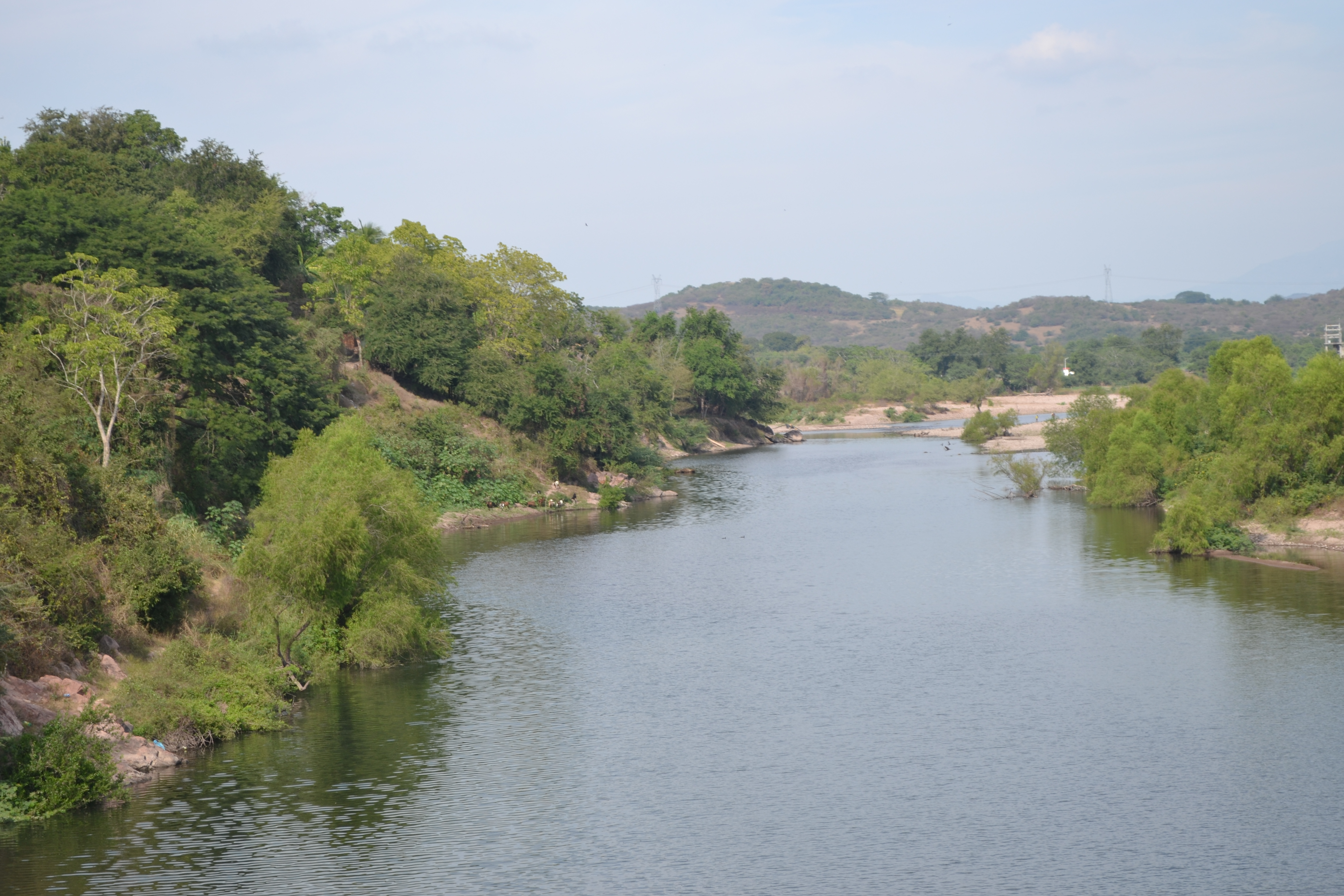

- Location of mouth

Location
- Country: Mexico
- State: Durango, Nayarit

Physical characteristics
- Mouth
  - location: Pacific Ocean
  - coordinates: 22°22′36″N 105°38′11″W
- Length: 233 km (145 mi)
- Basin size: 5,603.9 km^{2} (2,163.7 sq mi)
- Discharge
  - average: 5,000 L/s (180 cu ft/s)

The Acaponeta River originates in the State of Durango, Mexico and drains into the Pacific Ocean.

The river basin covers 5,399.68 square kilometres (2,084.83 sq mi). From its beginning in Durango to where it crosses into Nayarit, the river is called Quebrada de San Bartolo; farther downstream it's referred to as the Acaponeta.

Crossing the municipalities of Pueblo Nuevo, Durango; and Huajicori and Acaponeta, in Nayarit; it passes by the regions of Mineral de Cucharas, Quiviquinta, Huajicori, Acaponeta, San Felipe Aztatán, Tecuala, Milpas Viejas, El Filo and Quimichis; with its mouth in Estero de Teacapán, in a place called Puerta del Río (River's gate).

The river has a total length of 233 kilometres (145 mi) until Barra del Novillero; in the last 40 kilometres (25 mi), given its gentle slope, it is navagable by canoe, even in the dry seasons.

== See also ==
- List of rivers of Mexico
- List of rivers of the Americas by coastline
