= Chilapa =

Chilapa may refer to:

- Chilapa de Álvarez, a city in the Mexican state of Guerrero
- Chilapa, Nayarit, a city in the Mexican state of Nayarit
- Santa María Chilapa de Diaz, a town in the Mexican state of Oaxaca
- Chilapa River, a river in Mexico
- Chilapa, a minor character in the television show Xena: Warrior Princess
