= Assyrians in Mexico =

ܣܘܪ̈ܝܐ ܕܡܟܣܝܩܘ Asirios en México

Total population
- est. 2,000 Mexicans of Assyrian descent

Regions with significant populations
- Mexico City, Nuevo León, Jalisco, Sinaloa, Baja California, Guanajuato, Chihuahua, Durango, Puebla

Languages
- Mexican Spanish, Neo-Aramaic, Arabic, Persian

Religion
- Christianity (majority: Syriac Christianity; minority: Protestantism)

Assyrians in Mexico (Syriac: ܣܘܪ̈ܝܐ ܕܡܟܣܝܩܘ, Spanish: Asirios en México), or Mexican Assyrians, are Assyrian people or people of Assyrian descent living in Mexico. Most of the Assyrian immigrants who arrived in the country were Chaldean Catholic, as they fled from religious persecution and ethnic persecution in their historical homeland in modern-day Iraq, Turkey, Syria and Iran.

== History ==
The immigration of Chaldo-Assyrians from northern Iraq to North America started at the beginning of the 20th century. They, alongside Armenians, all came to the New World looking for job opportunities and for a better life. Driven out by the harsh treatment of the conquering Turks, most followed family members, joining them in established businesses. Jajjo Hajji is widely considered the first pioneer in Mexico. Hajji ended up in Veracruz, Mexico after leaving Adana, Turkey in 1901. Several other Chaldo-Assyrians migrated from Tel Keppe to Mexico and established communities in Salina Cruz, Saint Louis, Tecuala, Estabeca, Montreux, Mérida (Yucatán), and Mexico City.

== Culture ==
Due to a diluted population and a community scattered over a large geographic region, there is not a strong number of Chaldean churches in Mexico. Youth groups, social organizations, and inter-ethnic marriage in the Assyrian-Mexican community have resulted in a marked language shift away from Neo-Aramaic toward Spanish. The majority especially those of younger generations speak Spanish as their first language.

== See also ==
- Assyrian diaspora
