= El Nayar =

- Municipality
- Location in Mexico El Nayar (Mexico)
- Country: Mexico
- State: Nayarit

Government
  - Federal electoral district: Nayarit's 1st
- Demonym: (in Spanish)
- Time zone: UTC−7 (Zona Pacífico)

El Nayar is the largest municipality in the Mexican state of Nayarit. The population was 30,551 in 2005 in a total area of 5,100 km^{2} (2,000 sq mi). The municipal seat of Jesús María had a population of 1,520 in 2005. El Nayar is the home of the Huichol, Cora, and the Tepehuán Indians.

El Nayar is the largest municipality by land area in the state. Its area makes up 18.46% of the surface of the state. It is sparsely populated.

The name of the municipality is in honor of the tribal chief Cora Naye, Nayar, or Nayarit, caudillo, legislator, and king; defender of his tribe who successfully maintained the Huacica or Xécora kingdom. Nayarit was named leader of the Cora around the year 1500. During his reign, he was able to resist the Spanish incursions into the mountains and preserve his kingdom. When he died, his remains were preserved and venerated in a cave in the mountains.

The municipality of El Nayar is located in the northeastern portion of the state of Nayarit, between the extreme coordinates 21° 25 and 22° 40 latitude north and the meridian 103° 58' and 105° 03’ longitude west. In the north there are boundaries with the municipality of Acaponeta and the state of Durango; in the south with the municipalities of Tepic, Santa María del Oro and La Yesca; in the east with the states of Jalisco and Zacatecas and in the west with the municipalities of Santiago Ixcuintla, Acaponeta, Rosamorada and Ruíz. See map of state at and

This is the most rural of all the municipalities in the state and the one with the most scattered population.

The municipality is located in the Sierra Madre Occidental and there are several mountain peaks including Cerro Dolores (2,480 m) and Los Tecolotes (2,360 m).

The municipality is crossed by two major rivers: Rio San Pedro and the Bolaños-Huaynamota . There is also the reservoir of Aguamilpa, opened in 1997. See . This reservoir is located below the confluence of the waters of the Río Grande de Santiago and the Huaynamota. 21.884120°N 104.752579°W

The economy is based on agriculture, which due to the rough terrain, is limited to subsistence farming. The main crops are maize, beans and fruit trees.

The main ethnic groups are the Cora, Huichol, and Tepehuan with 10,515 and 6,349 inhabitants respectively (1995). These three ethnic groups make up 81.8% of the population over the age of 5. El Nayar has 49% of all the indigenous language speakers of the state. Of the total population of 21,948, 18,215 were members of the indigenous population. 12,103 of this population could speak Spanish and 5,809 could not.

The people are farmers, planting corn (maize), beans, squash, and cucumbers in steep hillside plots. Burning is used to clear undergrowth, plows and planting sticks being the chief cultivating implements. Most families keep a cow for milk and cheese, and sheep are sometimes kept for wool; however, very little meat is eaten. Other barnyard animals are also kept, and hunting, fishing, and gathering of wild foods augments farming. Neither the Huichol nor the Cora commonly live in villages but, rather, have households in the countryside clustered in loose groups of 1 to 12; these are called rancherias. Community centres consist of a church or Huicholtemple, public buildings, sometimes schools or jails, and houses that are kept by some families to live in when they are at the centre. The rancherias may be quite isolated from such community centres.
