= Milpas Viejas =

Milpas Viejas is a small town in the municipality of Tecuala, Nayarit, Mexico.

It is bordered by the Acaponeta River and is just 2 miles south west of Tecuala. The population according to 2000 Census is 1554 people.
