= María Hilaria Domínguez =

Mexican politician

Member of the Chamber of Deputies for Nayarit's 1st district
- In office 1 September 2003 – 31 August 2006
- Preceded by: Álvaro Vallarta Ceceña
- Succeeded by: Sergio González García

Member of the Chamber of Deputies for Nayarit's 2nd district
- In office 1 September 1976 – 31 August 1979
- Preceded by: Anselmo Ibarra Beas
- Succeeded by: Emilio M. González

Personal details
- Born: 12 March 1953 (age 73) Amatlán de Cañas, Nayarit, Mexico
- Party: PRI
- Occupation: Politician

María Hilaria Domínguez Arvizu (born 12 June 1953) is a Mexican politician affiliated with the Institutional Revolutionary Party (PRI).

Domínguez Arvizu has served as a federal deputy on two occasions:

- In the 50th session of Congress (1976–1979), representing Nayarit's second district
- In the 59th session of Congress (2003–2006), representing Nayarit's first district.
