= Huajicori =

Municipality in Nayarit, Mexico

- Municipality and town
- Huajicori
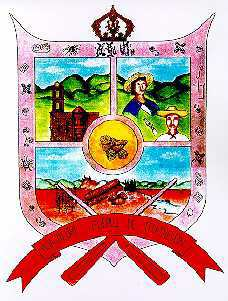
- Coat of arms

- Location in the state of Nayarit

- Location in Mexico
- Coordinates: 22°38′00″N 105°19′00″W
- Country: Mexico
- State: Nayarit
- Municipal seat: Huajicori

Government
  - Federal electoral district: Nayarit's 1st
- Elevation: 60 m (200 ft)

Population (2015)
  - Total: 11,400
- Time zone: UTC-7 (Zona Pacífico)
- Website: www.huajicori.gob.mx

Huajicori (Spanish: [waxiˈkoɾi]) is both a municipality and the municipal seat of the same in the Mexican state of Nayarit, being the northernmost municipality in Nayarit. The population of the municipality was 10,294 in 2000 in a total area of 2,603.5 km^{2}. Its area makes up almost 10% of the state. The population of the town was 2,201 (2005).

Huajicori is located 180 km north of the state capital Tepic, 125 km north of Santiago Ixcuintla, and 19 km northwest of Acaponeta.

== Etymology ==
The name comes from the Cora word "Huaxi-imi", (peyote) and "Huac", which is the denomination "a lot of peyote"; so Huajicori means the place "Where there is a lot of peyote".

== Economy ==
The economy is based on subsistence farming and cattle raising. The main crops are corn, beans, jamaica, and fruit trees.

== Geography ==
Huajicori is located 180 km north of the state capital Tepic, 125 km north of Santiago Ixcuintla, and 19 km northwest of Acaponeta. It is bounded in the north by the municipality of Pueblo Nuevo, Durango; in the south with the municipality of Acaponeta, in the west with the municipality of Escuinapa, in the state of Sinaloa; in the northwest with the municipality of Rosario, state of Sinaloa. The Río de las Cañas forms the boundary between the states of Nayarit and Sinaloa.

=== Climate ===
Climate data for Huajicori (1951–2010)
Month	Jan	Feb	Mar	Apr	May	Jun	Jul	Aug	Sep	Oct	Nov	Dec	Year
Record high °C (°F)	38.0 (100.4)	39.0 (102.2)	41.0 (105.8)	44.0 (111.2)	43.0 (109.4)	43.0 (109.4)	42.0 (107.6)	42.0 (107.6)	41.0 (105.8)	42.0 (107.6)	40.0 (104.0)	44.5 (112.1)	44.5 (112.1)
Mean daily maximum °C (°F)	31.5 (88.7)	32.3 (90.1)	34.0 (93.2)	35.4 (95.7)	36.9 (98.4)	36.9 (98.4)	35.5 (95.9)	34.7 (94.5)	34.6 (94.3)	34.6 (94.3)	33.4 (92.1)	31.9 (89.4)	34.3 (93.7)
Daily mean °C (°F)	22.8 (73.0)	23.1 (73.6)	24.6 (76.3)	25.9 (78.6)	28.1 (82.6)	29.7 (85.5)	28.8 (83.8)	28.4 (83.1)	28.4 (83.1)	27.9 (82.2)	25.5 (77.9)	23.4 (74.1)	26.4 (79.5)
Mean daily minimum °C (°F)	14.0 (57.2)	13.9 (57.0)	15.2 (59.4)	16.3 (61.3)	19.2 (66.6)	22.5 (72.5)	22.2 (72.0)	22.1 (71.8)	22.3 (72.1)	21.1 (70.0)	17.5 (63.5)	14.9 (58.8)	18.4 (65.1)
Record low °C (°F)	1.0 (33.8)	4.5 (40.1)	3.0 (37.4)	9.0 (48.2)	8.0 (46.4)	14.0 (57.2)	16.0 (60.8)	12.0 (53.6)	12.0 (53.6)	12.0 (53.6)	7.0 (44.6)	1.5 (34.7)	1.0 (33.8)
Average precipitation mm (inches)	22.6 (0.89)	10.7 (0.42)	3.6 (0.14)	1.9 (0.07)	4.8 (0.19)	107.0 (4.21)	342.9 (13.50)	398.8 (15.70)	347.8 (13.69)	80.4 (3.17)	26.2 (1.03)	21.2 (0.83)	1,367.9 (53.85)
Average precipitation days (≥ 0.1 mm)	1.5	0.9	0.4	0.3	0.3	6.1	17.4	18.5	15.8	4.3	1.4	1.9	68.8
Source: Servicio Meteorologico Nacional
