= Ruiz, Nayarit =

Municipality in Nayrit, Mexico

Coordinates: 21°57′N 105°09′W

Ruiz
- Municipality

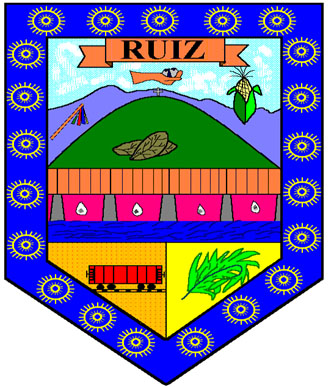
- Coat of arms

- Location in Mexico Ruiz (Mexico)
- Country: Mexico
- State: Nayarit

Government
  - Federal electoral district: Nayarit's 1st

Population (2020)
  - Municipality: 36,990
- Demonym: (in Spanish)
- Time zone: UTC-7 (Zona Pacífico)

Ruiz is a municipality and the municipal seat of the same located in the north of the Mexican state of Nayarit.

== Origin of the name ==
The name was given to honor General Mariano Ruiz (1846–1932), soldier of the Mexican Revolution and last political leader of the territory of Tepic, who lived in and supplied the settlement until 1910.

== Population ==
The population of the municipality, according to the census of 1995, was 25, 591. The municipal seat itself had 12,266 inhabitants in 1995.

=== Indigenous population ===
There is a relatively large indigenous population that lives in the mountains. According to the 1995 census it consisted of 1,866 people, or 9.8% of the population. The most numerous ethnic groups are the Cora and the Huichol. These Native Americans can often be seen in the main population center selling their traditional crafts and stocking up on provisions.

== Geography ==
The total area of the municipality was 900 square kilometers. Ruiz has boundaries in the north with the municipalities of Rosamorada and El Nayar; in the south with the municipalities of El Nayar and Santiago Ixcuintla; in the west with the municipalities of Santiago Ixcuintla, Tuxpan and Rosamorada, and in the east with the municipality of El Nayar. See detailed map at

The area of the municipality extends from the western lowlands to the foothills of the Sierra Madre Occidental. About 70% of its surface is made up of rugged lands. The municipal seat is located on the coastal plain at an elevation of 30 meters above sea level. It is here where the agricultural lands are found, especially near the San Pedro River. In the mountains peaks reach as high as 1,640 meters, the case of Los Coquitos.

=== Climate ===
The climate is mild rainy and subhumid, with the rains falling from June to September. The area is free of frost and moderate winds are of little intensity.

== Economy ==
The economy is based on agriculture with the main crops being: coffee, maize, sorghum, beans, pineapple, watermelon, tobacco, and chile. There is also significant cattle raising with around 20,000 head of cattle.
