= 1st federal electoral district of Nayarit =

Federal electoral district of Mexico

Nayarit's 1st
- Electoral district of the Chamber of Deputies of Mexico

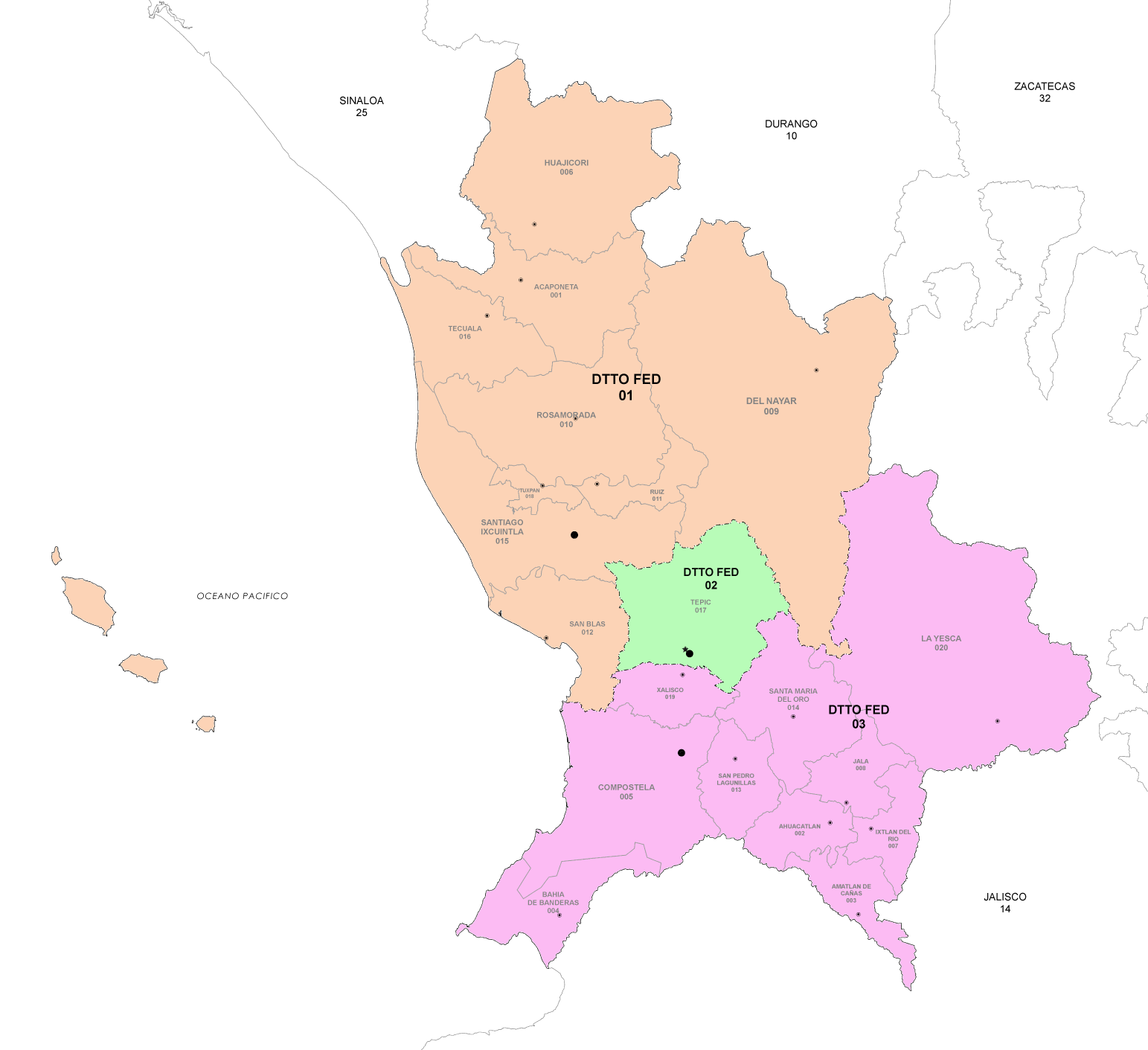
- 1st district since 2017

Incumbent
- Member: Any Marilú Porras Baylón
- Party: ▌Morena
- Congress: 66th (2024–2027)

District
- State: Nayarit
- Head town: Santiago Ixcuintla
- Coordinates: 21.03°N 104.37°W
- Covers: Acaponeta, Huajicori, El Nayar, Rosamorada, Ruiz, San Blas, Santiago Ixcuintla, Tecuala, Tuxpan
- PR region: First
- Precincts: 402
- Population: 357,383 (2020 census)

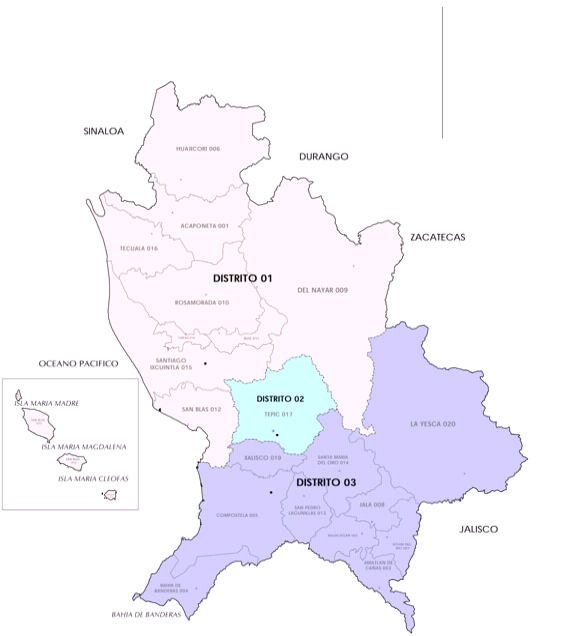
Nayarit under the 2017–2022 districting plan

The 1st federal electoral district of Nayarit (Spanish: Distrito electoral federal 01 de Nayarit) is one of the 300 electoral districts into which Mexico is divided for elections to the federal Chamber of Deputies and one of three such districts in the state of Nayarit.

It elects one deputy to the lower house of Congress for each three-year legislative session by means of the first-past-the-post system. Votes cast in the district also count towards the calculation of proportional representation ("plurinominal") deputies elected from the first region.

The current member for the district, elected in the 2024 general election, is Any Marilú Porras Baylón of the National Regeneration Movement (Morena).

== District territory ==
Under the 2023 districting plan adopted by the National Electoral Institute (INE), which is to be used for the 2024, 2027 and 2030 federal elections, the 1st district covers 402 precincts (secciones electorales) across the state's nine northern municipalities, including the Islas Marías:

- Acaponeta, Huajicori, El Nayar, Rosamorada, Ruiz, San Blas, Santiago Ixcuintla, Tecuala and Tuxpan.

The head town (cabecera distrital), where results from individual polling stations are gathered together and tallied, is the city of Santiago Ixcuintla. The district reported a population of 357,383 in the 2020 census.

== Previous districting schemes ==
Evolution of electoral district numbers
	1974	1978	1996	2005	2017	2023
Nayarit	2	3	3	3	3	3
Chamber of Deputies	196	300				

2017–2022

Between 2017 and 2022, the district had the same composition as in the 2023 plan.

2005–2017

The district was in the north of the state and covered the municipalities of Acaponeta, El Nayar, Huajicori, Rosamorada, Ruiz, Santiago Ixcuintla, Tecuala and Tuxpan; i.e., the 2023 configuration without San Blas (assigned to the 3rd district). The head town was at Santiago Ixcuintla.

1996–2005

Between 1996 and 2005, the district covered seven municipalities: the same territory as in the 2005 plan, with the exception of the municipality of El Nayar, which belonged to the 2nd district.

1978–1996

The districting scheme in force from 1978 to 1996 was the result of the 1977 electoral reforms, which increased the number of single-member seats in the Chamber of Deputies from 196 to 300. Under that plan, Nayarit's seat allocation rose from two to three. The 1st district had its head town at Tepic and it covered the municipalities of El Nayar, Rosamorada, Tepic and Tuxpan.

== Deputies returned to Congress ==
(Mexico) National parties
- Current
- PAN
- PRI
- PT
- PVEM
- MC
- Morena
- PAZ
- Somos
- Defunct or local only
- PLM
- PNR
- PRM
- PNM
- PP
- PPS
- PARM
- PFCRN
- CON
- PANAL
- PSD
- PES
- PES
- PRD

Nayarit's 1st district
Election	Deputy	Party	Term	Legislature
1916	Cristóbal Limón		1916–1917	Constituent Congress of Querétaro
1917	Jesús Ibarra		1917–1918	27th Congress
1918	José María Ruíz H.		1918–1920	28th Congress
1920	Francisco Trejo		1920–1922	29th Congress
1922	Marco Esmerio		1922–1924	30th Congress
1924	Agustín Arriola Valadez		1924–1926	31st Congress
1926	Antioco Rodríguez		1926–1928	32nd Congress
1928	Guillermo Ponce de León		1928–1930	33rd Congress
1930	Francisco Trejo		1930–1932	34th Congress
1932	Guillermo Flores Muñoz		1932–1934	35th Congress
1934	Eugenio Cárdenas Andrade		1934–1937	36th Congress
1937	Luis Aranda del Toro	Institutional Revolutionary Party	1937–1940	37th Congress
1940	Candelario Miramontes		1940–1943	38th Congress
1943	Alberto Tapia Carrillo		1943–1946	39th Congress
1946	Antonio Pérez Cisneros		1946–1949	40th Congress
1949	Francisco García Montero	Institutional Revolutionary Party	1949–1952	41st Congress
1952	José Angulo Araico		1952–1955	42nd Congress
1955	Felipe Ibarra Partida		1955–1958	43rd Congress
1958	Salvador Arámbul Ibarra	Institutional Revolutionary Party	1958–1961	44th Congress
1961	Manuel Stephens García	Popular Socialist Party (Mexico)	1961–1964	45th Congress
1964	Eugenio Cárdenas Andrade	Institutional Revolutionary Party	1964–1967	46th Congress
1967	Roberto Gómez Reyes; Pedro López Díaz	Institutional Revolutionary Party	1967–1969; 1969–1970	47th Congress
1970	Salvador Díaz Coria	Institutional Revolutionary Party	1970–1973	48th Congress
1973	Joaquín Cánovas Puchades	Institutional Revolutionary Party	1973–1976	49th Congress
1976	Ignacio Langarica Quintana	Institutional Revolutionary Party	1976–1979	50th Congress
1979	Alberto Tapia Carrillo	Institutional Revolutionary Party	1979–1982	51st Congress
1982	Antonio Pérez Peña	Institutional Revolutionary Party	1982–1985	52nd Congress
1985	José Félix Torres Haro	Institutional Revolutionary Party	1985–1988	53rd Congress
1988	Salvador Sánchez Vázquez	Institutional Revolutionary Party	1988–1991	54th Congress
1991	Rigoberto Ochoa Zaragoza (Note: Ochoa Zaragoza requested a leave of absence to contend (successfully) for the governorship of Nayarit.); Juan Alonso Romero	Institutional Revolutionary Party	1991–1993; 1993–1994	55th Congress
1994	Fidel Pineda Valdez	Institutional Revolutionary Party	1994–1997	56th Congress
1997	Marco Antonio Fernández	Institutional Revolutionary Party	1997–2000	57th Congress
2000	Álvaro Vallarta Ceceña	Institutional Revolutionary Party	2000–2003	58th Congress
2003	María Hilaria Domínguez Arvizu	Institutional Revolutionary Party	2003–2006	59th Congress
2006	Sergio González García	Institutional Revolutionary Party	2006–2009	60th Congress
2009	Manuel Cota Jiménez	Institutional Revolutionary Party	2009–2012	61st Congress
2012	Juan Manuel Rocha Piedra	Institutional Revolutionary Party	2012–2015	62nd Congress
2015	Efraín Arellano Núñez	Institutional Revolutionary Party	2015–2018	63rd Congress
2018	Miguel Pavel Jarero Velázquez	National Regeneration Movement	2018–2021	64th Congress
2021	Miguel Pavel Jarero Velázquez	National Regeneration Movement	2021–2024	65th Congress
2024	Any Marilú Porras Baylón	National Regeneration Movement	2024–2027	66th Congress

== Presidential elections ==
Nayarit's 1st district
Election	District won by	Party or coalition	%
2018	Andrés Manuel López Obrador	Juntos Haremos Historia	60.8614
2024	Claudia Sheinbaum Pardo	Sigamos Haciendo Historia	68.5932
