= El Filo =

El Filo is a small town in Tecuala municipality, Nayarit, Mexico.
