= Juan Manuel Rocha Piedra =

Mexican politician

Member of the Chamber of Deputies for Nayarit′s 1st district
- In office 1 September 2012 – 31 August 2015
- Preceded by: Manuel Cota Jiménez
- Succeeded by: Efraín Arellano Núñez

Personal details
- Born: 27 June 1960 (age 65) Nayarit, Mexico
- Party: PRI
- Occupation: Deputy

Juan Manuel Rocha Piedra (born 27 June 1960) is a Mexican politician affiliated with the PRI. As of 2013 he served as Deputy of the LXII Legislature of the Mexican Congress representing Nayarit.
