= Mexcaltitán de Uribe =

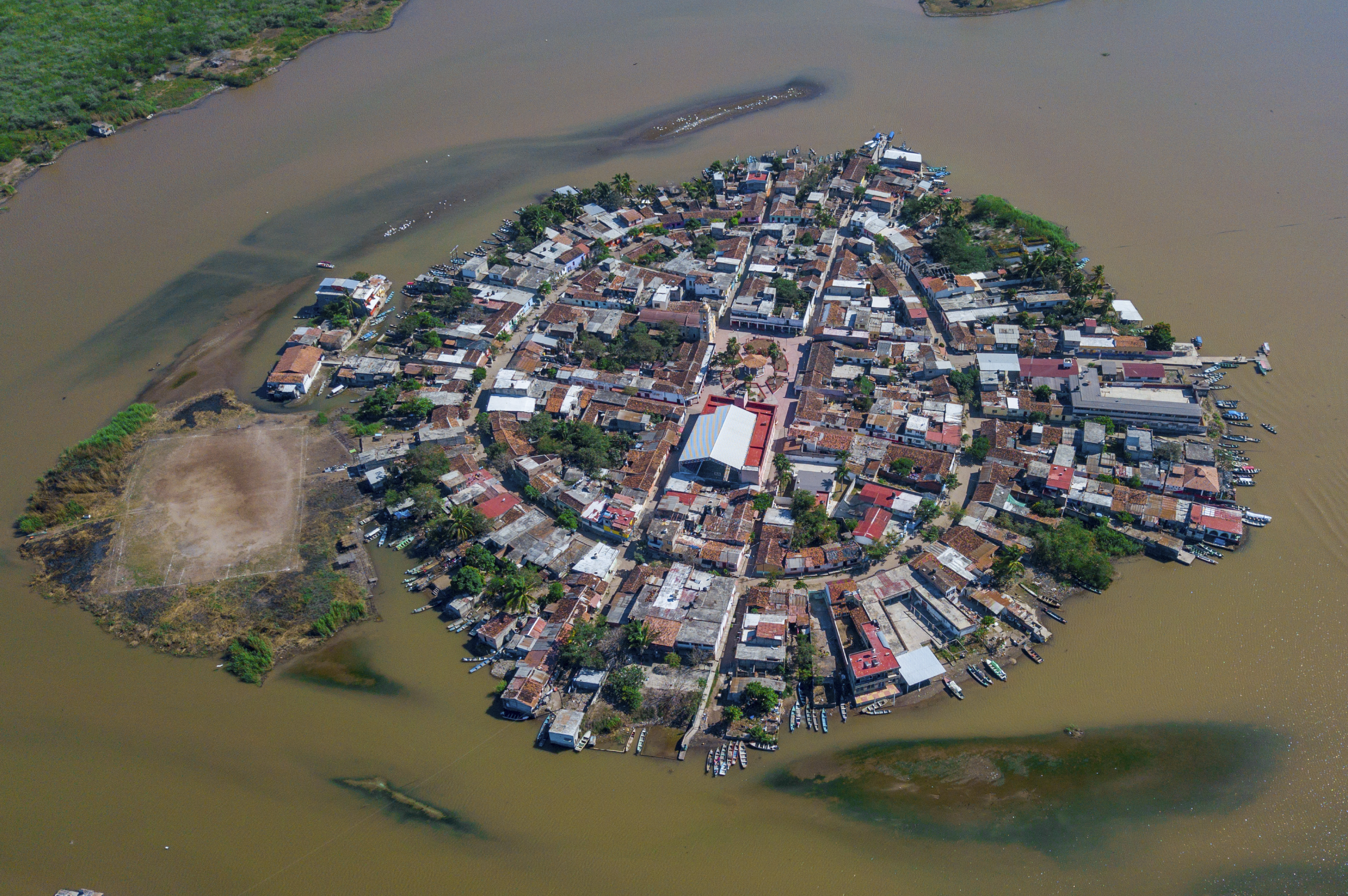
- A bird's eye view of Mexcaltitán.
- Interactive map of Mexcaltitán de Uribe
- Coordinates: 21°54′21″N 105°28′30″W
- Country: Mexico
- State: Nayarit
- Municipality: Santiago Ixcuintla

Population (2010)
  - Total: 818
- Demonym: Mexcaltitánense

Mexcaltitán de Uribe, also known simply as Mexcaltitán, is a small, artificial island-city in the municipality of Santiago Ixcuintla in the Mexican state of Nayarit. Its name derives from two Náhuatl words, mexcalli ("cooked maguey, cooked agave") and suffix -titlan ("among, around; under").

This island is now being promoted as a tourist attraction. It was designated a "Pueblo Mágico" by the federal government in 2001, and after losing the status for several years was reinstated in 2020. It is accessible by boat from La Batanga, which is the dock area located some 40 kilometers from Santiago Ixcuintla. It is known as "The Mexican Venice" (La Venecia Mexicana).

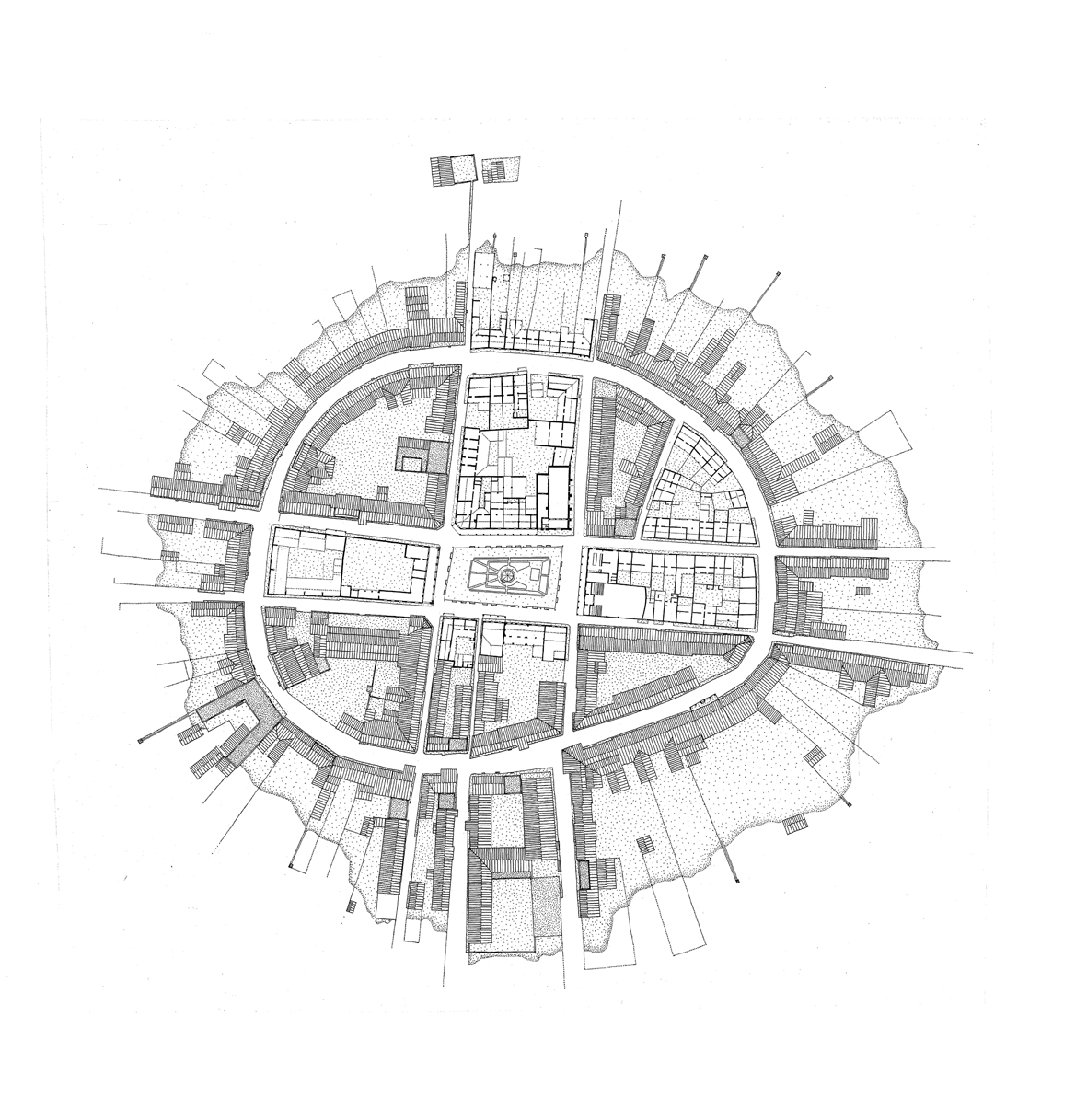
Plan of Mexcaltitan

The principal attraction of the island is its colorful houses with traditional water-resistant roofs. During the rainy season, it is necessary to travel by boat due to flooding in the streets.

== Geographic location ==
The island is approximately 340 m (1,100 ft) in diameter, nearly round in shape.

Currently it is a nationally recognized tourist center, located 36 km (22 mi) from the city of Santiago Ixcuintla, and 100 km (62 mi) from the city of Tepic.

== History ==
During the 1960s, Mexican intellectuals began to seriously speculate about the possibility that Mexcaltitán was the mythical city of Aztlán, from where the Mexicas (later known as the Aztecs) left to initiate their pilgrimage. One of the first to consider Aztlán being linked to the Nayaritian island was historian Alfredo Chavero towards the end of the 19th century. Historical investigators after his death tested his proposition and considered it valid, among them Wigberto Jiménez Moreno. This hypothesis is still up for debate.

In July 2009 the title of Pueblo Mágico was taken from the island city by the Mexican Secretary of Tourism, because it didn't comply with the observations made by the Comité Técnico during the National Meeting of Pueblos Mágicos which took place in February of the same year in Tapalpa, Jalisco. The designation was officially restored to Mexcaltitán in December 2020.

== Demographics ==
In the 2010 INEGI census, the island had 818 inhabitants.

== Infrastructure ==
Among other landmarks, the city boasts a museum, a Catholic church, the ejido (public farmland allotted to citizens) commission, an elementary school and a government-operated hospital.

The island is served by 2 ferries: La Batanga, the most transited, 6 km (4 mi) away from Mexcaltitán and El Matadero, smaller than the other, 2 km (1.2 mi) away from the island.

The ejido of Mexcaltitán consists of an extensive area of land and water, and is considered considerably superior to other nearby ejidos in the same district, consisting of the cities of El Mezcal, Aztlán de las Garzas, San Miguel Nº 2, El Nuevo Mexcaltitán, and San Vicente.
