= Tecuala =

Town and municipality in Nayarit, Mexico

- Municipality
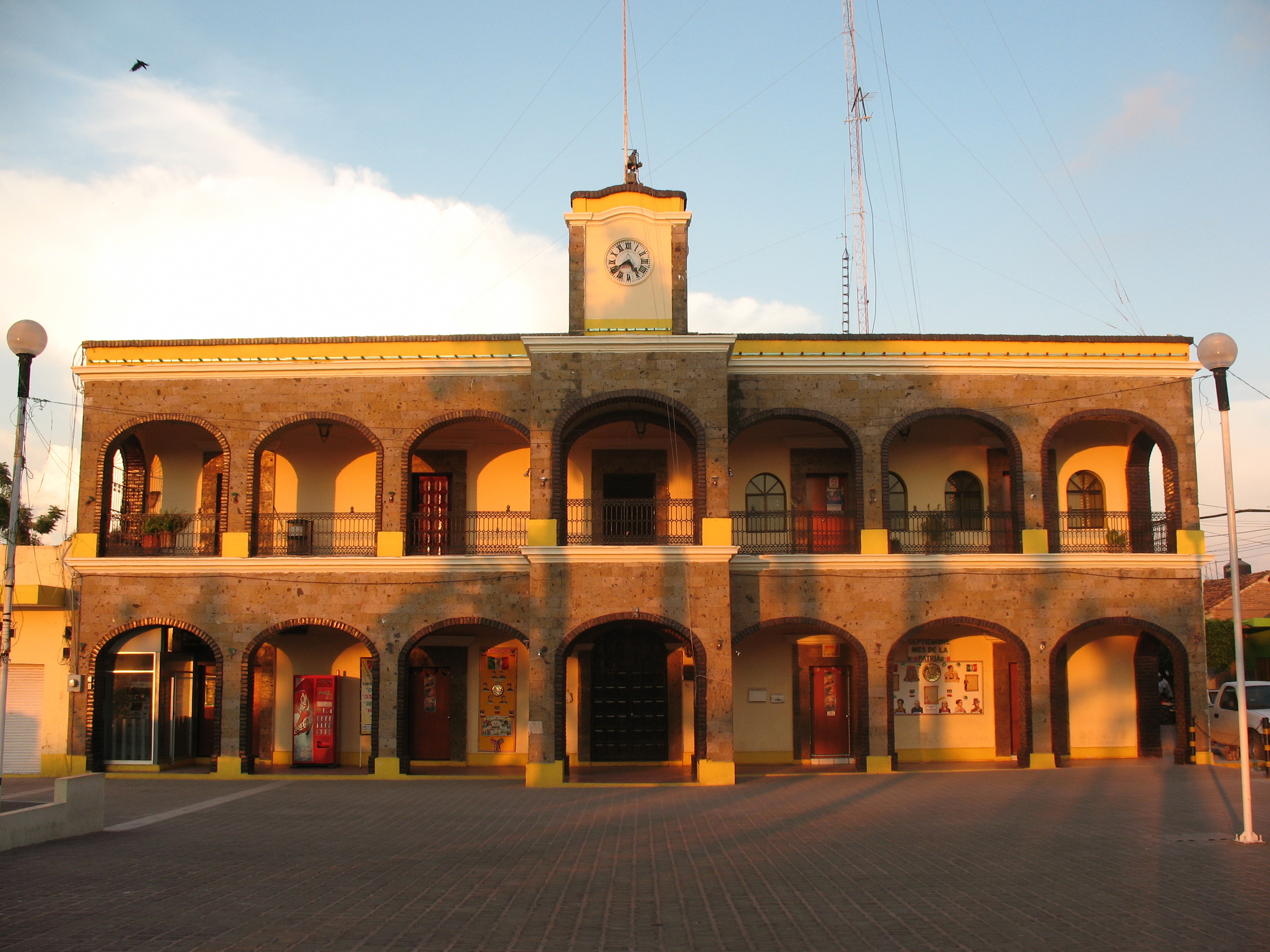
- Town hall

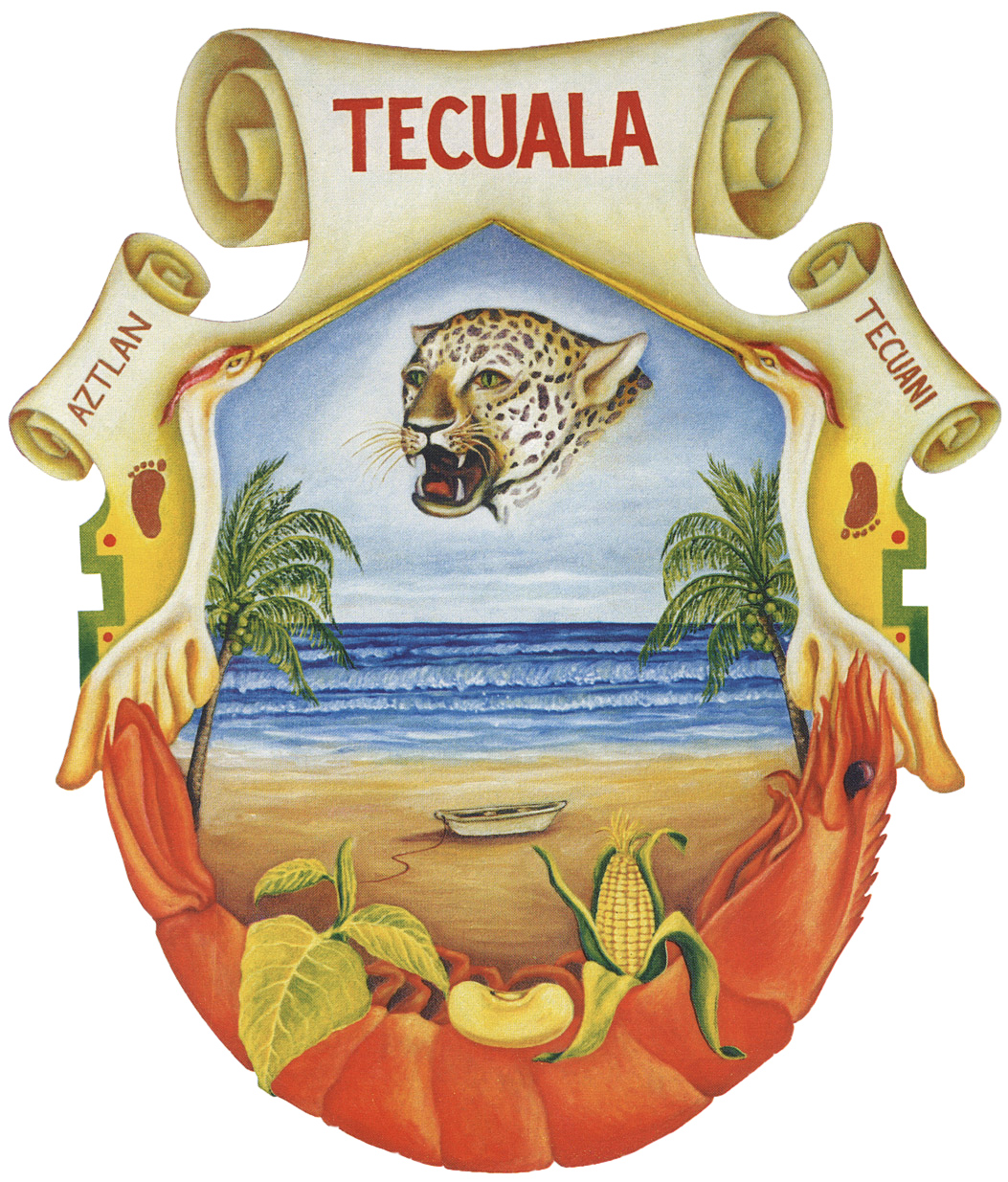
- Coat of arms

- Location in Mexico Tecuala (Mexico)
- Country: Mexico
- State: Nayarit

Government
  - Federal electoral district: Nayarit's 1st
- Demonym: (in Spanish)
- Time zone: UTC-7 (Zona Pacífico)

Tecuala is both a municipality and a town in the Mexican state of Nayarit, on the Pacific coast. The population of the municipality was 42,237 in a total area of 1,137 km^{2} (439 sq mi) (2000) while the population of the town and municipal seat was 14,584 (2000). One of the longest beaches in the world, Playa Novillero, is located here.

"Tecuala" is the Castilian form of the Tecuallan word, which means "place of many wild animals".

== Geography ==
The municipality of Tecuala is located in the northern part of the state of Nayarit, between parallels 22° 14', and 22° 34' north latitude and meridians 105° 14' and 105° 45' west longitude. It is bounded in the north by the state of Sinaloa and the municipality of Acaponeta; in the south by the municipalities of Santiago Ixcuintla and Rosamorada, in the east by the municipality of Acaponeta and in the west by the Pacific Ocean.

Most of the land is flat and tending to mangrove swamps in the west, forming part of the national protected zone called Marismas Nacionales. The most important river is the Acaponeta, which flows into the Agua Brava lagoon.

=== Climate ===
The climate is hot, tropical, subhumid, with the rainy season from July to September, and the hottest months from June to August. The average annual rainfall is 1,200 mm. and the average annual temperature is 22 °C, varying between 26 °C and 18 °C.

== Economy ==
The economy is based on agriculture with the main crops being sorghum, beans, tobacco, corn, chili peppers, watermelon and jícama. There is also widespread cattle raising. Shrimp farming is carried out in the many lagoons.

It is said, that former governor of Sinaloa state; Antonio Toledo Corro and Monterrey-based developers Grupo Novisa who apparently own the peninsula have a very aggressive plan with the idea to start a new era for the new Riviera which will employ hundreds of people and increase the living standards of the people who live within the area.

== Tourism ==
The popular Novillero beach is listed in Guinness World Records for being one of the longest beaches in the world—82 kilometers. The Acaponeta River flows into the ocean here and nearby is the Agua Brava lagoon, a place of great fishing and shrimp production. In San Felipe Aztatán, one can visit a monument to the origins of the Mexican people.

Today, Tecuala is the new target for real estate developers focused on tourist matters. Playa Novillero, especially the "Peninsula", which has a total area of approximately 3,460-acre (1,400 ha) with ocean and river front, has plans within the next few months to initiate a new concept of a tourist project.
