= Chilapa, Nayarit =

Settlement in Rosamorada, Nayarit, Mexico

Coordinates: 22.0314°N 105.2306°W

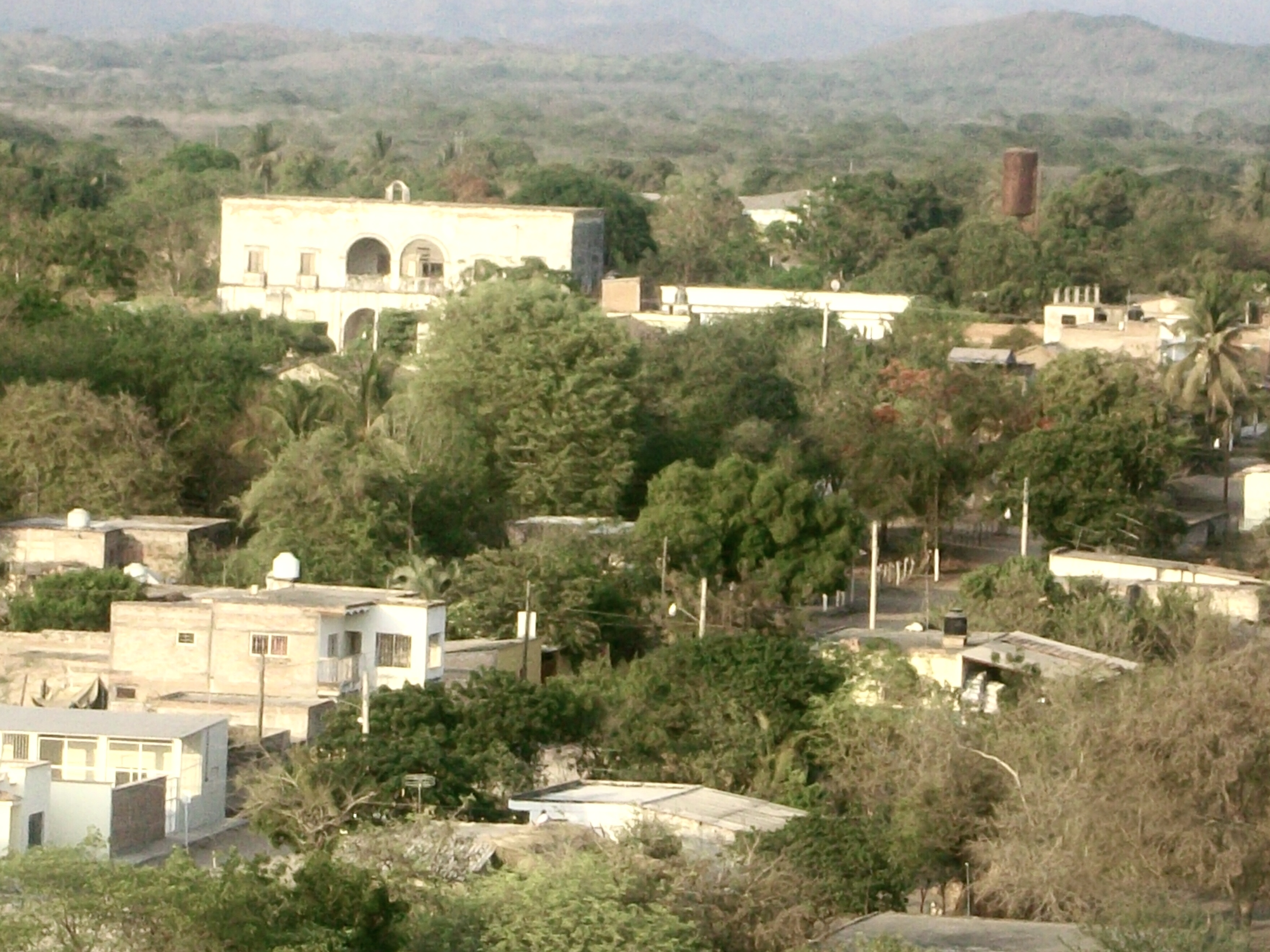
Chilapa, Nayarit

Chilapa is a settlement in the municipality of Rosamorada in the state of Nayarit, Mexico, 80 kilometres north of the city of Tepic, on national highway number 15. It is located between Rosamorada on the north, El Tamarindo and San Vicente on the south, Paso Real del Bejuco on the east and Colonia 18 de Marzo on the west.

There are several versions regarding the origin of the word "Chilapa." An accepted one affirms that it is derived from the Nahuatl word: "chilapan" or "Chilar in the water." According to the last census Chilapa has population of 1,856 people.

== History ==
Its foundation is directly related to the former cattle estate found there. The ranch was founded in 1713 when the King of Spain sold the property to Mrs. Francisca Ramon de Moncada for 330 gold currency. Through the pass of time, the land changed owners. Here is the list of the most relevant ones:

1. in 1720 Diego Ramón de Moncada.
2. in 1726 Don Diego Zea.
3. in 1733 the nuns from the Santa Maria de Gracia convent from Guadalajara, Jalisco.
4. in 1770 Don Rodrigo Fernández de Ubiarco
5. in 1801 Pedro Nazario de Zea
6. in 1876 Domingo y Victor Aguirre until 1935.

The estate had control about 80,000 hectares of land. This was pure livestock property. It was said at the time that when the owners wanted steers, they could have the luxury of choosing all in the same colour. It was also said that people from the vicinity who wanted employment in the ranch, had to show up at 2am. Otherwise, they would be out of work for the week.

The dowry of lands to the common (creation of the Chilapa common land) was in the year 1936 due to efforts led by the farmers Ramon Lara, Luciano Cobarrubias Luna y Miguel López Ocegueda.

During President's Lázaro Cárdenas del Río term, a resolution was signed to give land to 120 common farmers.

The Hacienda's Main house was built between 1900 - 1904. The last hacienda owners (who still are) is the Vaqueiro family. Nowadays, the Hacienda is practically abandoned. It is still occupied, but since the owners have moved to Guadalajara, the maintenance and care has fallen apart.

== Ground Characteristics ==
The type of land is sandy and heavy. It has minor slope and regular drainage. Most of the land is arable, although many hectares can be used for rangeland. From the arable land, most of it is of better use in dry season (November to April). Making it produce by irrigation. It is very few extensions that can be farmable by seasonal farming (June to October) since the production is not cost effective.

== Demographics ==
Chilapa is the fourth-most populated locality in the municipality of Rosamorada. Its current population is 1,953 inhabitants, of which 993 are male and 960 female.
