= Rosamorada =

- City and municipality
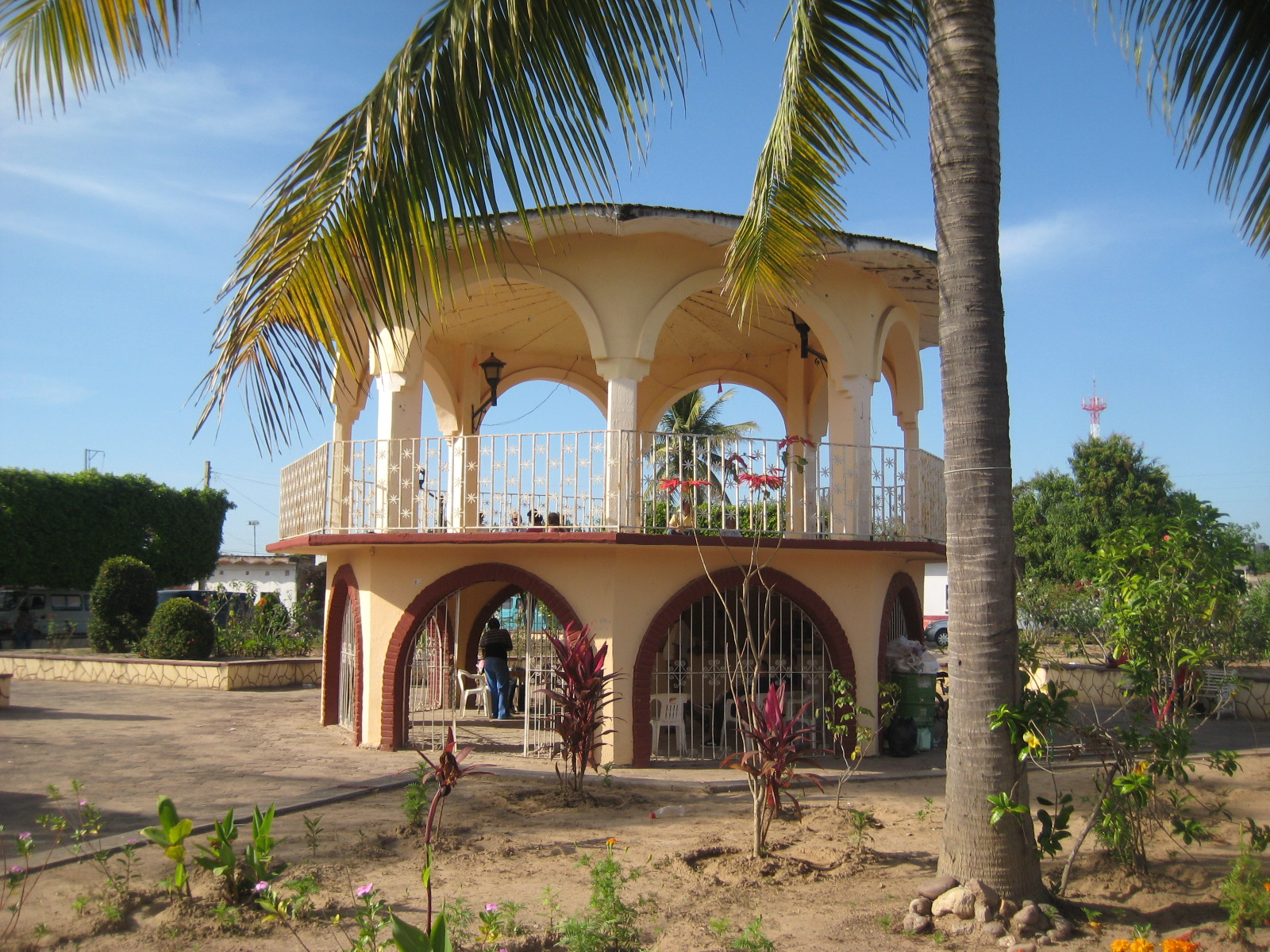

- Location of the municipality in Nayarit

- Location within Nayarit Location within Mexico
- Country: Mexico
- State: Nayarit

Government
  - Federal electoral district: Nayarit's 1st

Population (2020)
  - Total: 34,393
- Time zone: UTC-7 (Zona Pacífico)

Rosamorada (Spanish pronunciation: [rosamoˈɾaða]) is a municipality of the state of Nayarit in Mexico. It is situated in the northwestern part of the state. The area of the municipality is 2,073 km^{2} and the population was 32,217 in 2005, showing a significant decrease from 1980 when it was 34,695. Most of the population is still rural with the major settlements being Rosamorada with 3,393 inhabitants; San Vicente with 4,556; Los Pericos with 2,441; Chilapa with 2,277; Pimientillo with 1,824 and El Tamarindo with 1,544.

== Etymology ==
Rosamorada got its name from the existence of a leafy tree of purple flowers called "clavellina" once found in the center of the town.

== Economy ==
The economy is primarily agricultural with the main crops being beans, chilli, rice, melons, and watermelon. There is also significant fishing and shrimp raising in the lagoons adjacent to the Pacific Ocean.

== Language ==
About 17.4% of Rosamorada's population, or 5,840 people aged 3 and older, speak at least one Indigenous language. The most common languages are Cora, spoken by 5,413 people, followed by Huichol (341 speakers) and Southern Tepehuano (64 speakers).

The majority of the population speaks Spanish, as it is Mexico's de-facto national language.

== Geography ==
The western part of the municipality is composed of mangrove swamps with several large freshwater lagoons formed by the Bejuco, San Juan and San Pedro rivers, the latter being the southern boundary with the municipalities of El Nayar, Ruíz, and Tuxpan. The eastern part of the municipality consists of foothills gradually climbing to the Sierra Madre Occidental.
