= Tuxpan, Nayarit =

Coordinates: 21°52′00″N 105°27′00″W

Tuxpan
- Municipality
- Location in Mexico Tuxpan (Mexico)
- Country: Mexico
- State: Nayarit

Government
  - Federal electoral district: Nayarit's 1st
- Demonym: (in Spanish)
- Time zone: UTC-7 (Zona Pacífico)

Tuxpan is both a municipality and a municipal seat in the Mexican state of Nayarit. It is Nayarit's smallest municipality. It is located in the west of the state and has boundaries with the municipalities of Rosamorada in the north, Santiago Ixcuintla in the south and west, and Ruiz in the east.

The area of the municipality is 474.3 km^{2} and the population was 28,550 in 2005, which was a drop from the population of 34,079 in 1980. The population of the municipal seat was 22,481 in the same year.

Most of the land is flat and there is intensive agriculture. The main crops are beans, sorghum, tobacco, bananas, and mangoes. The estuary zone in the west is used for production of shrimp.

The municipality is crossed by the Río San Pedro and there is often extensive flooding in the rainy season.

== History of Tuxpan Municipality ==
Tuxpan during prehispanic times was an important place named Ayutuxpan, contributed to the kingdom of Sentispac. At Coamiles were settled the most important ceremonial centres; according to historic Christian Duverger, the ceremonial centre is composed by various structures, today are known 40, they possess more than 150 printings and its infrastructures are stones filled up with sun-dried bricks. It also embraces megalithic composes of big carving blocks, organized horizontally and vertically combined with voluminous rocks.

== Main characters ==
Leaders; Antonio R. Laureles and Prisciliano Góngora, they fought for the land divisions and formations of cooperatives in Tuxpan and the State of Nayarit.

They were murdered in 1922, at the back stalls inside the Government Palace, today known as Casa Fenelón

== Historic Facts and Chronology ==
1530.- Military explorations of conquistador Nuño Beltrán de Guzmán crossed by the zone towards Aztlán. 1607.- Convent of Santa Catalina was built to evangelize natives. 1885.- After Independence Tuxpan become land of Tepic. 1917.- Constituted as a municipality of the Sovereign and Free State of Nayarit. 1919.- Farmers requested cooperative to subdivide farm lands. Also, the biggest cooperative in Mexico.
