= Sergio González García =

Mexican politician

- Born: 7 October 1955 (age 70); Nayarit, Mexico
- Occupation: Politician
- Political party: PRI

Sergio González García (born 7 October 1955) is a Mexican politician affiliated with the Institutional Revolutionary Party (PRI). In 2006–2009 he served as a federal deputy in the 60th Congress, representing the first district of Nayarit.
