= Acaponeta =

- City and municipality
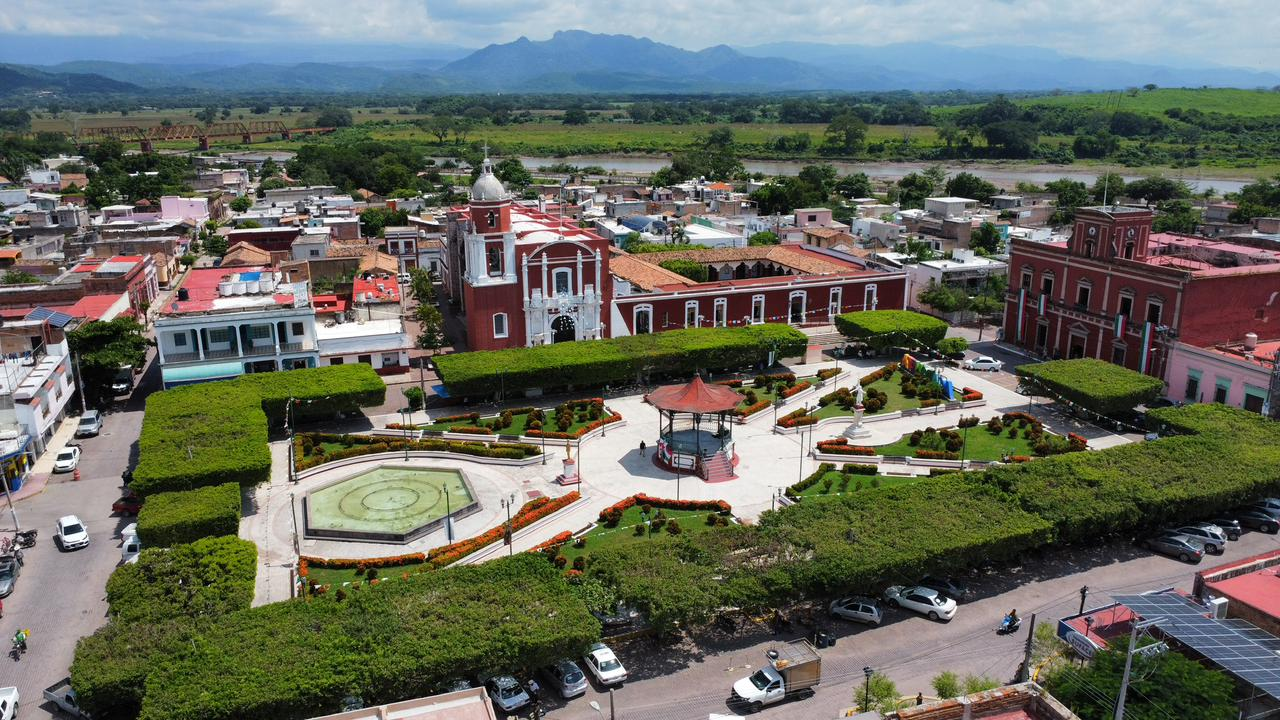
- View of Acaponeta

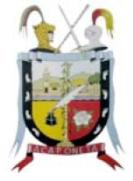
- Coat of arms

- Location of Acaponeta in Nayarit
- Coordinates: 22°29′47″N 105°21′34″W
- Country: Mexico
- State: Nayarit

Government
  - Federal electoral district: Nayarit's 1st

Population (2020)
  - Total: 37,232
  - Seat: 19,976
- Time zone: UTC−7 ( Zona Pacífico)

Acaponeta is both a municipality and a town in the northern part of the Mexican state of Nayarit. The town is located at the geographical coordinates of 22°29′47″N 105°21′34″W. The population of the municipality was 34,665 in the 2005 census, living in a total area of 1,667.7 km^{2} (643.9 sq mi). The population of the municipal seat was 18,066, the fifth-largest community in the state (after Tepic, Xalisco, Ixtlán del Río, and Tuxpan). The Acaponeta River flows through the town.

Acaponeta means, "Place near the river where the bean tangled in the reed-grows"; which is formed by joining the translation of the Tepehuano word Acaponeta (Caponeta) which means, "place near the river"; and the Nahuatl Acatl-pol-etl-tlan, which means, "place where the bean tangled in the reed grows".

The municipality is crossed by the Nogales, Sonora-Mexico City railroad and there is a station in the municipal seat. Distances to some major cities are: Mazatlán 150.3 km.; Tepic 166.2 km.; Mexicali 1,707.4 km.; Mexico City 1,056.8 km.; Guadalajara 443.9 km.

== Economy ==
The economy of the region is heavily dependent on agriculture. The main crops are corn (maize), beans, sorghum, tobacco, chile, mangos and avocados. There is a modest cattle herd as well as swine and poultry.

Industry is little developed and consists of small transformation industries. The municipality has one of the oldest processing plants for corn flour as well as packing houses for mangos.

Agriculture employs over 40% of the economically active population, 41% are in services, and 16% in industry. Due to the agricultural nature of the economy there is high sub-employment and subsequent immigration to the United States of America.

== Geography ==
=== Climate ===
The climate is hot, subhumid, with the rainy season between June and September. The average annual rainfall is 1,307 mm., of which 92% is registered in the months of July to September. The average temperature is 26.7 °C. (80 °F)

Climate data for Acaponeta
Month	Jan	Feb	Mar	Apr	May	Jun	Jul	Aug	Sep	Oct	Nov	Dec	Year
Mean daily maximum °C (°F)	30.1 (86.2)	31.3 (88.3)	32.6 (90.7)	34.3 (93.7)	35.8 (96.4)	35.8 (96.4)	34.2 (93.6)	33.8 (92.8)	33.5 (92.3)	34.0 (93.2)	33.3 (91.9)	30.8 (87.4)	33.3 (91.9)
Mean daily minimum °C (°F)	13.5 (56.3)	13.3 (55.9)	13.8 (56.8)	15.7 (60.3)	19 (66)	23.1 (73.6)	22.9 (73.2)	22.7 (72.9)	23 (73)	21.6 (70.9)	18.1 (64.6)	15 (59)	18.5 (65.3)
Average precipitation mm (inches)	20 (0.8)	10 (0.4)	5.1 (0.2)	2.5 (0.1)	2.5 (0.1)	110 (4.3)	350 (13.8)	370 (14.6)	320 (12.5)	91 (3.6)	28 (1.1)	20 (0.8)	1,330 (52.2)
Source: Weatherbase

== Notable people ==
- Ali Chumacero – poet
- Ramón Corona – general and diplomat
