= Santiago Ixcuintla =

- City
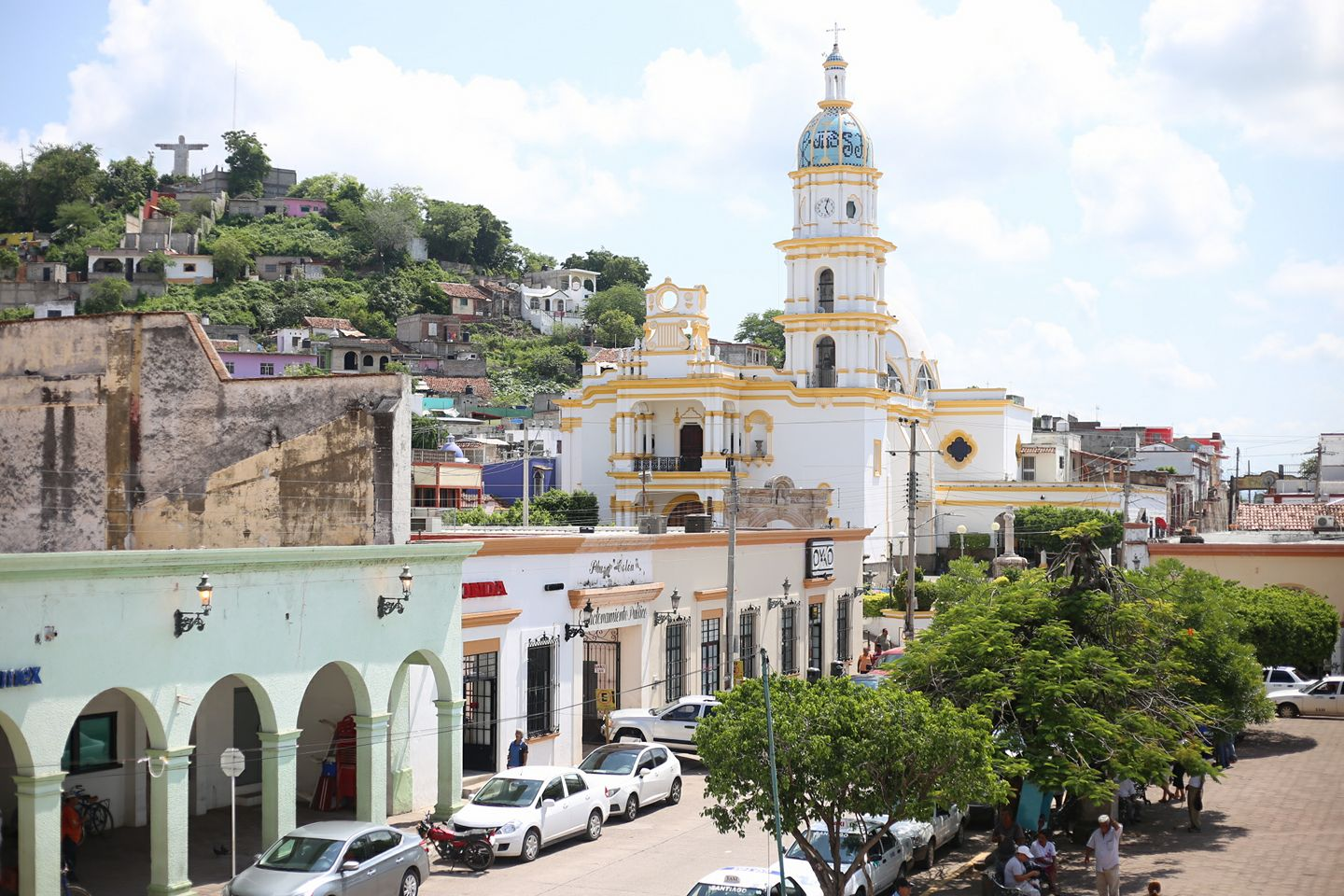
- View of Santiago Ixcuintla

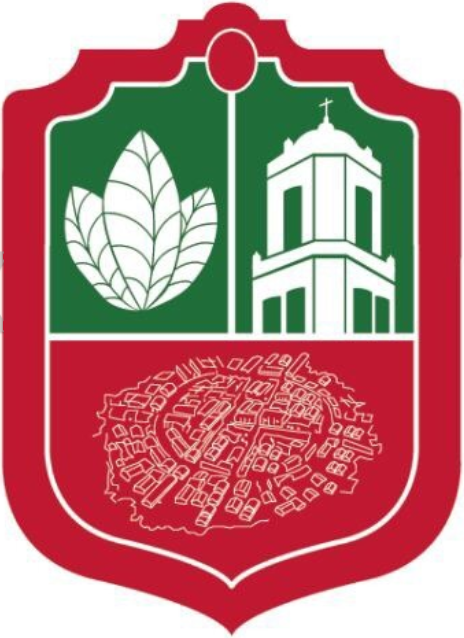
- Coat of arms

- Location of Santiago Ixcuintla in Nayarit
- Coordinates: 21.808°N 105.205°W
- Country: Mexico
- State: Nayarit

Government
  - Federal electoral district: Nayarit's 1st

Population (2020)
  - Total: 93,981
  - Seat: 25,241
- Time zone: UTC-7 (Zona Pacífico)

Santiago de Ixcuintla is a municipality and a municipal seat in the western Mexican state of Nayarit. The municipal population was 93,981 inhabitants (census of 2020) with the municipal seat having a population of 25,241. The area of the municipality was 1,831.92 square kilometers. It is located at 21º48'40" N and 105º12'23" W.

The most important population centers are the municipal seat, Santiago Ixcuintla, with 18,169 inhabitants; Villa Hidalgo with 11,175, La Presa with 3,932, Yago with 3,919, Pozo de Ibarra with 3,342 and Villa Juárez with 3,158. Forty-six percent of the population lives in these communities.

Much of the land is only slightly above sea level. Lagoons make up the western section where two important rivers, the Río Grande de Santiago and the Río San Pedro, enter the sea. In the east, the land gradually rises to form the foothills of the Sierra Madre Occidental. The municipal seat of Santiago is situated at approximately 30 meters above sea level.

The economy is based on agriculture and small manufacturing industries. The main crops are tobacco, citrus fruits, beans, watermelon, chile, mangoes, bananas, and coffee. Santiago is one of the most important tobacco-producing regions of the country. Fishing along the coast and in the many lagoons is also important.

On July 11, 1991, a sounding rocket was launched at Santiago Ixcuintla for solar research during a solar eclipse.

There is an unexploited touristic potential in the area due to the vast inland waters making up the Marismas Nacionales. This protected area consists of a vast network of brackish coastal lagoons, mangrove swamps, mudflats, and marshes. It is fed by the Río Acaponeta and tributary streams, including the delta of the Río San Pedro. On one of the lagoons lies the island village of Mexcaltitlán, accessible only by small boat.

== Mural Nuestras Raíces ==
One attraction that stands out in the sight of all those who visit the community is the Nuestras Raices Mural. Nuestras Raíses which translates to "Our roots" was made between 1991 and 1993 using the Mexican mosaic technique, resulting in a beautiful work of art that highlights the wonders of the culture. The mural measures 1100 meters square and is said to represent the origins of Mexico as stated by the history of the Island of Mexcaltitán. This mythic history also states that Santiago is the mythical city of Aztlán.
