= Municipalities of Nayarit =

List of municipalities of Mexican state

Map of Mexico with Nayarit highlighted

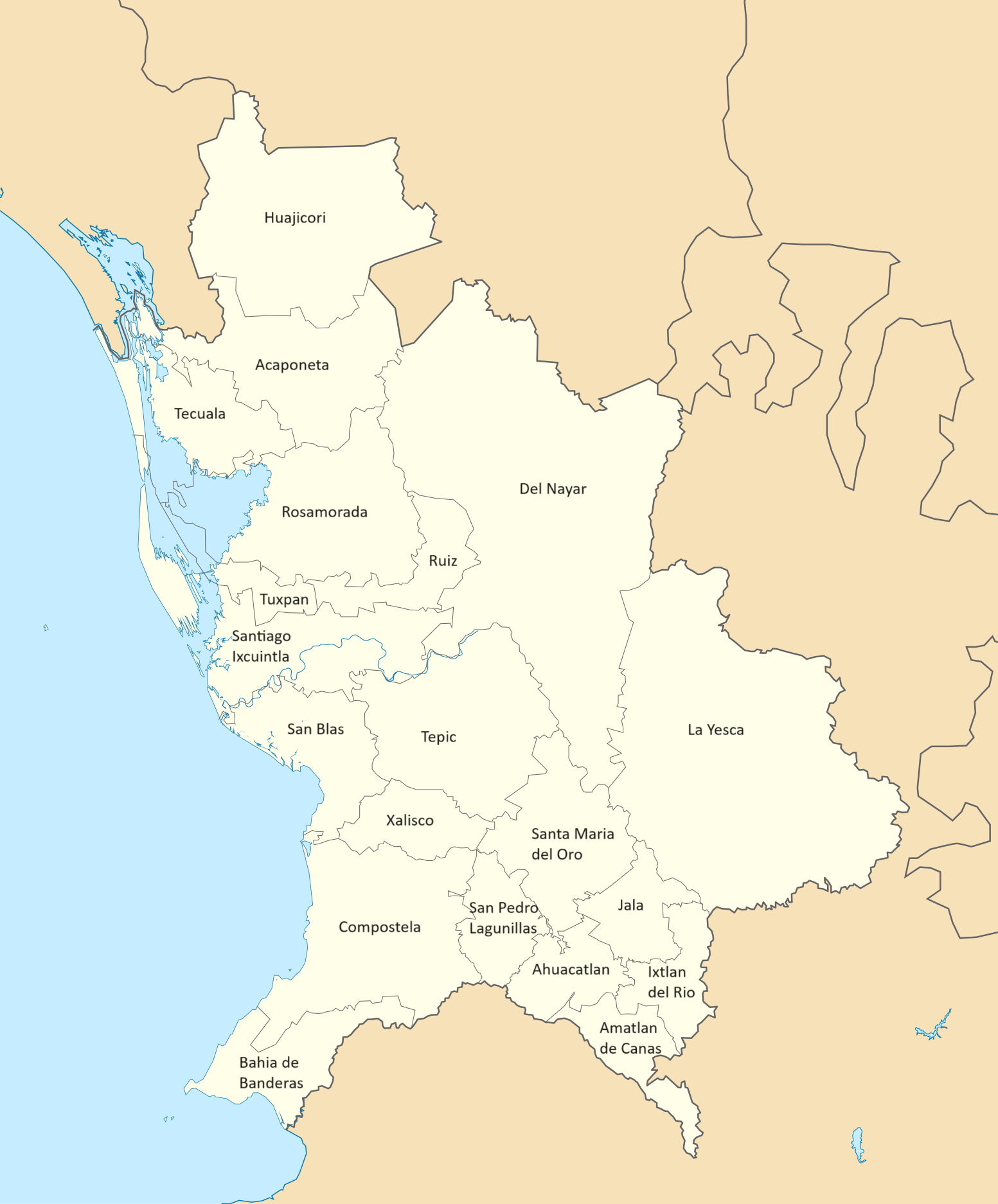
Nayarit Municipalities

Nayarit is a state in western Mexico, divided into twenty municipalities. According to the 2020 INEGI census, it is the fourth least populated state with 1,235,456 inhabitants and the 23rd largest by land area spanning 27,856.5 square kilometres (10,755.5 sq mi).

Municipalities in Nayarit are administratively autonomous of the state according to the 115th article of the 1917 Constitution of Mexico. Every three years, citizens elect a municipal president (Spanish: presidente municipal) by a plurality voting system who heads a concurrently elected municipal council (ayuntamiento) responsible for providing all the public services for their constituents. The municipal council consists of a variable number of trustees and councillors (regidores y síndicos). Municipalities are responsible for public services (such as water and sewerage), street lighting, public safety, traffic, and the maintenance of public parks, gardens and cemeteries. They may also assist the state and federal governments in education, emergency fire and medical services, environmental protection and maintenance of monuments and historical landmarks. Since 1984, they have had the power to collect property taxes and user fees, although more funds are obtained from the state and federal governments than from their own income.

The largest municipality by population is the state capital Tepic, with 425,924 residents, while the smallest is San Pedro Lagunillas with 7,683 residents. The largest municipality by land area is Del Nayar which spans 5,142.40 km^{2} (1,985.49 sq mi), and the smallest is Tuxpan with 313.90 km^{2} (121.20 sq mi). The newest municipality is Bahía de Banderas, established in 1989.

== Municipalities ==
Largest municipalities in Nayarit by population

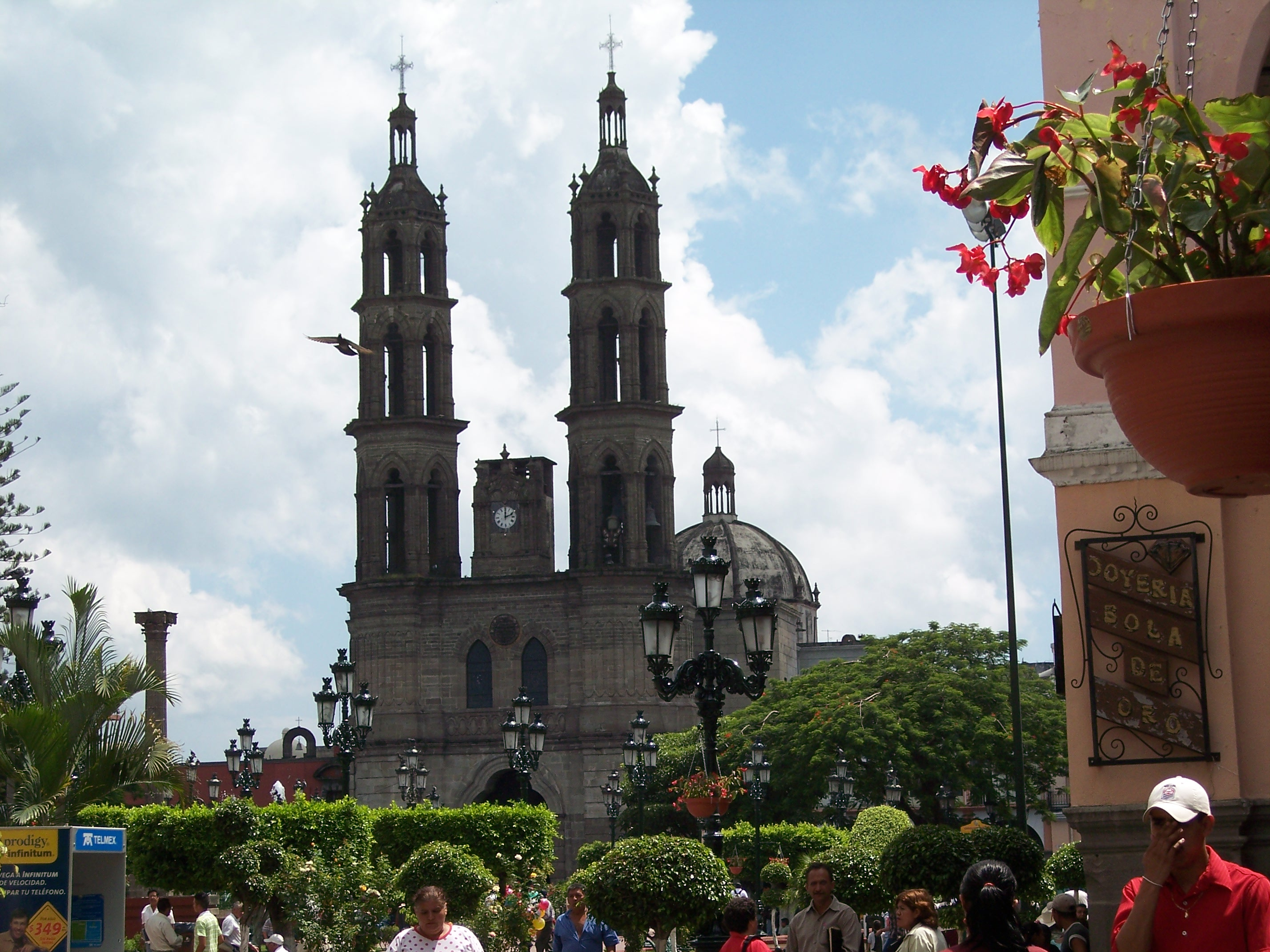
Tepic is the largest municipality by population in Nayarit.

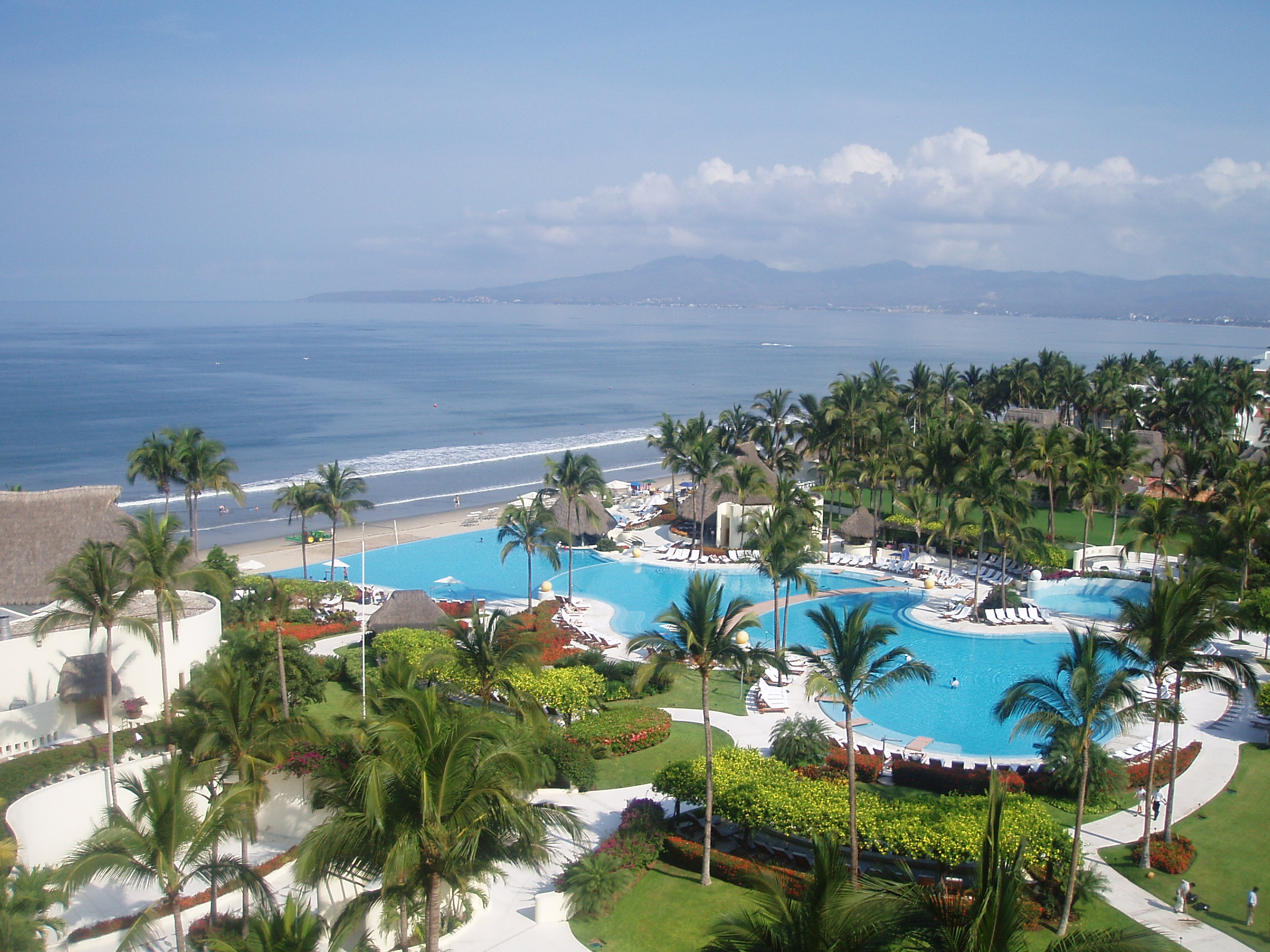
The second largest municipality by population is Bahía de Banderas.

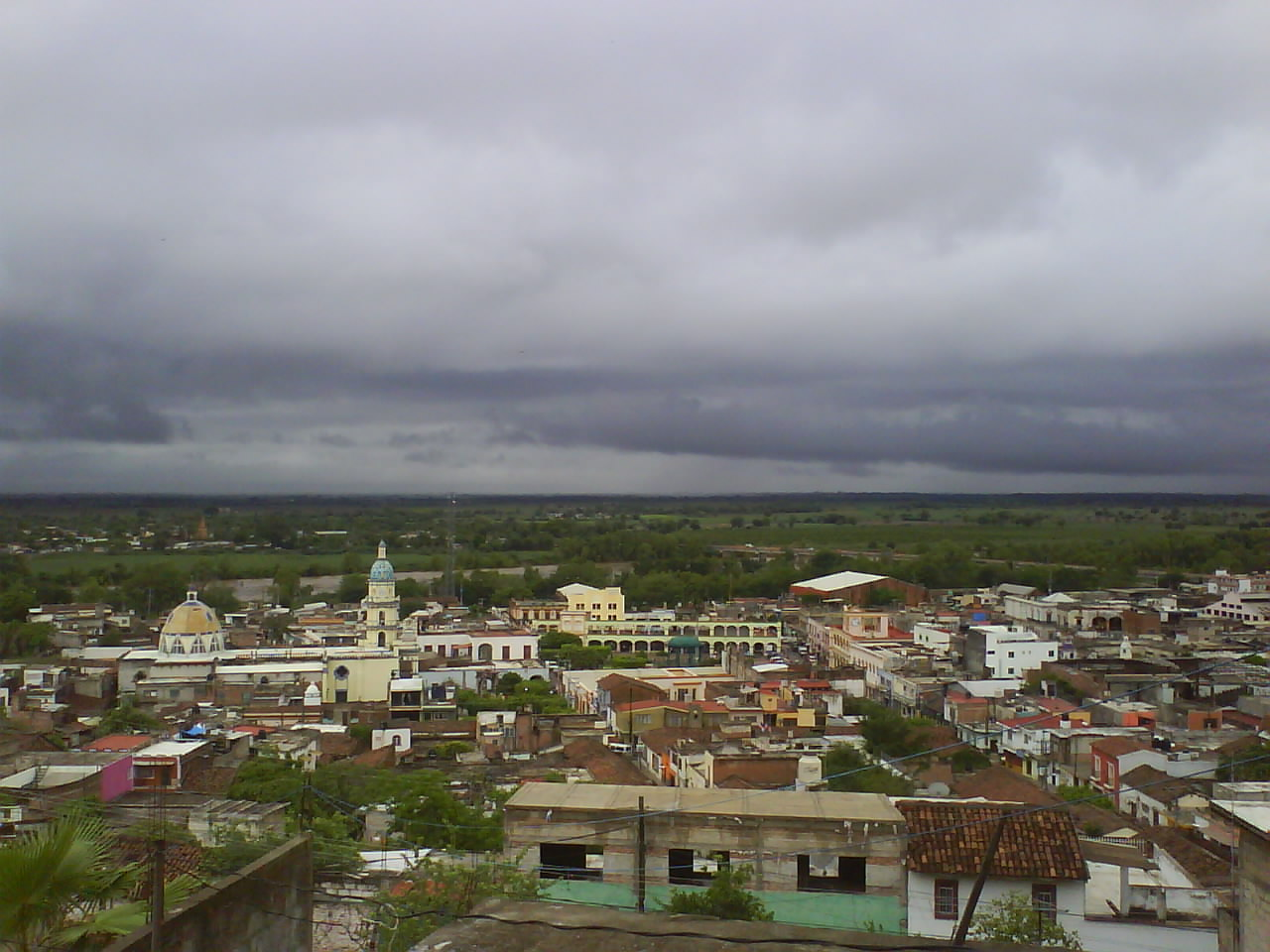
Santiago Ixcuintla is the third largest municipality by population.

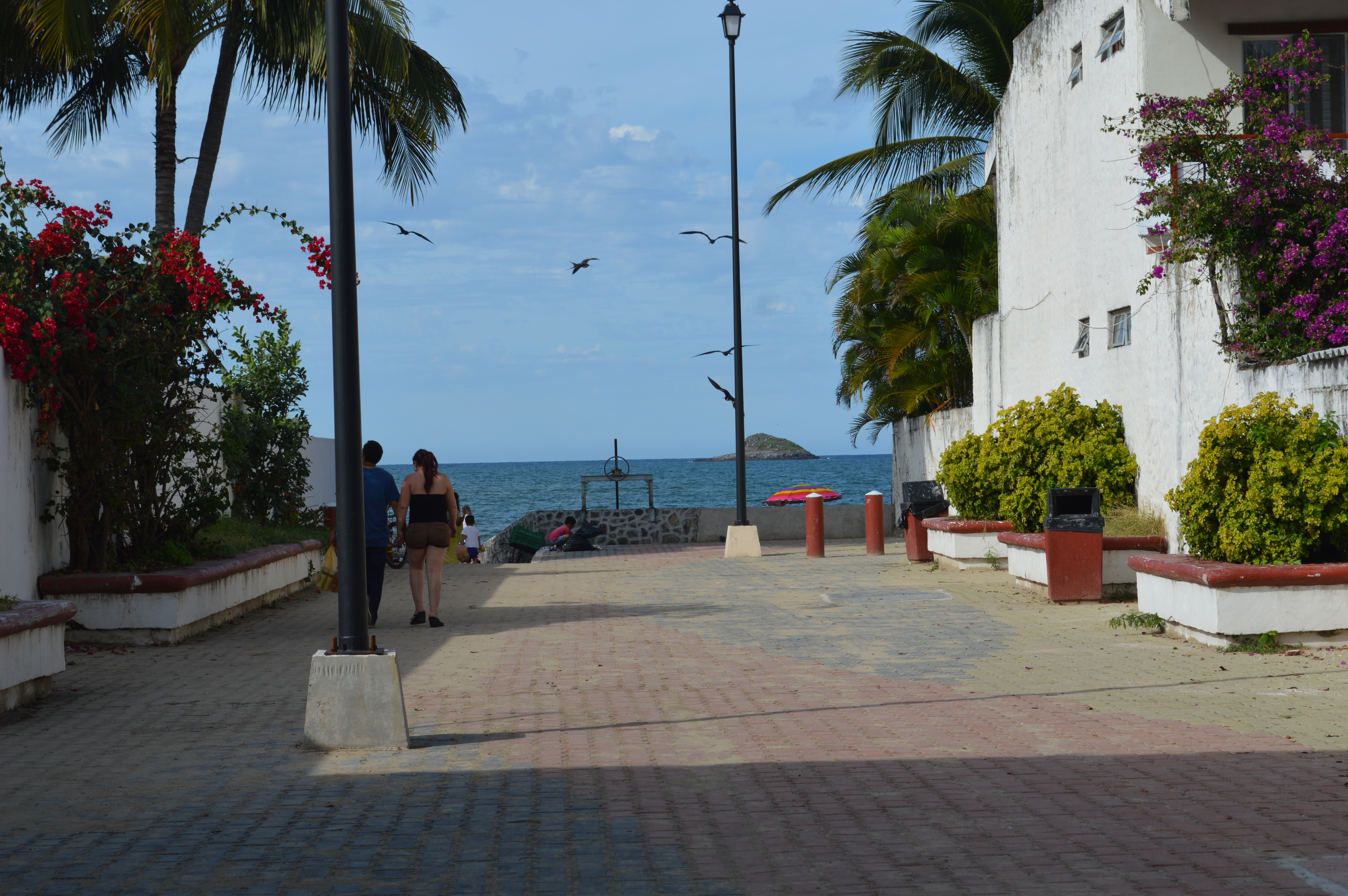
The fourth largest municipality by population is Compostela.

† State capital

Municipalities of Nayarit
Name	Municipal seat	Population (2020)	Population (2010)	Change	Land area		Population density (2020)	Incorporation date
Name	Municipal seat	Population (2020)	Population (2010)	Change	km^{2}	sq mi	Population density (2020)	Incorporation date
Acaponeta	Acaponeta	37,232	36,572	+1.8%	1,427.3	551.1	26.1/km^{2} (67.6/sq mi)	June 21, 1823
Ahuacatlán	Ahuacatlán	15,393	15,229	+1.1%	504.8	194.9	30.5/km^{2} (79.0/sq mi)	June 21, 1823
Amatlán de Cañas	Amatlán de Cañas	11,536	11,188	+3.1%	518.3	200.1	22.3/km^{2} (57.6/sq mi)	March 27, 1824
Bahía de Banderas	Valle de Banderas	187,632	124,205	+51.1%	771.4	297.8	243.2/km^{2} (630.0/sq mi)	December 13, 1989
Compostela	Compostela	77,436	70,399	+10.0%	1,880.5	726.1	41.2/km^{2} (106.7/sq mi)	June 21, 1823
Del Nayar (Note: Del Nayar was originally incorporated as Jesús María, changing its name on December 6, 1939.)	Jesús María	47,550	34,300	+38.6%	5,142.4	1,985.5	9.2/km^{2} (23.9/sq mi)	April 4, 1851
Huajicori	Huajicori	12,230	11,400	+7.3%	2,237.4	863.9	5.5/km^{2} (14.2/sq mi)	February 5, 1918
Ixtlán del Río	Ixtlán del Río	29,299	27,273	+7.4%	493.0	190.3	59.4/km^{2} (153.9/sq mi)	August 15, 1823
Jala	Jala	19,321	17,698	+9.2%	503.6	194.4	38.4/km^{2} (99.4/sq mi)	August 15, 1823
La Yesca (Note: La Yesca was originally incorporated as Real de la Yesca, changing its name on June 3, 1885.)	La Yesca	13,719	13,600	+0.9%	4,316.7	1,666.7	3.2/km^{2} (8.2/sq mi)	March 27, 1824
Rosamorada	Rosamorada	33,567	34,393	−2.4%	1,840.6	710.7	18.2/km^{2} (47.2/sq mi)	August 15, 1823
Ruiz	Ruiz	24,096	23,469	+2.7%	520.6	201.0	46.3/km^{2} (119.9/sq mi)	March 16, 1940
San Blas	San Blas	41,518	43,120	−3.7%	867.1	334.8	47.9/km^{2} (124.0/sq mi)	June 21, 1823
San Pedro Lagunillas	San Pedro Lagunillas	7,683	7,510	+2.3%	515.7	199.1	14.9/km^{2} (38.6/sq mi)	February 5, 1918
Santa María del Oro	Santa María del Oro	24,911	22,412	+11.2%	1,091.4	421.4	22.8/km^{2} (59.1/sq mi)	June 21, 1823
Santiago Ixcuintla (Note: Santiago Ixcuintla was originally incorporated as Sentispac, changing its name on April 6, 1837.)	Santiago Ixcuintla	93,981	93,074	+1.0%	1,727.8	667.1	54.4/km^{2} (140.9/sq mi)	June 21, 1823
Tecuala	Tecuala	37,135	39,756	−6.6%	1,044.8	403.4	35.5/km^{2} (92.1/sq mi)	February 5, 1918
Tepic	Tepic†	425,924	380,249	+12.0%	1,602.6	618.8	265.8/km^{2} (688.3/sq mi)	June 21, 1823
Tuxpan	Tuxpan	30,064	30,030	+0.1%	313.9	121.2	95.8/km^{2} (248.1/sq mi)	June 3, 1885
Xalisco	Xalisco	65,229	49,102	+32.8%	536.3	207.1	121.6/km^{2} (315.0/sq mi)	August 15, 1823
Nayarit	—	1,235,456	1,084,979	+13.9%	27,856.5	10,755.5	44.4/km^{2} (114.9/sq mi)	—
Mexico	—	126,014,024	112,336,538	+12.2%	1,960,646.7	757,010	64.3/km^{2} (166.5/sq mi)	—
