= Ahuacatlán, Nayarit =

Municipality in Nayarit, Mexico

Coordinates: 21°03′13″N 104°29′13″W

Ahuacatlán
- Municipality
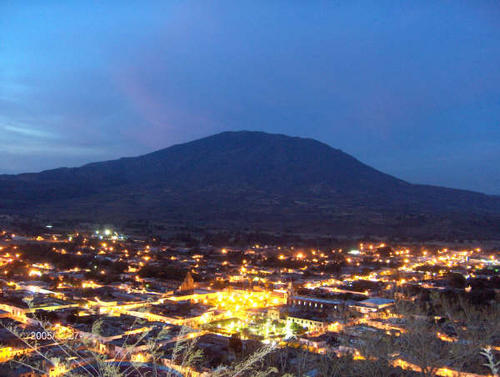

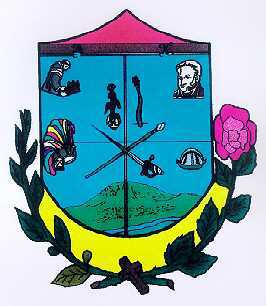
- Coat of arms

- Location in Mexico Ahuacatlán (Mexico)
- Country: Mexico
- State: Nayarit

Government
  - Federal electoral district: Nayarit's 3rd
- Demonym: (in Spanish)
- Time zone: UTC−7 (Zona Pacífico)

Ahuacatlán (Spanish pronunciation: [awakaˈtɬan]) is both a municipality and a municipal seat in the Mexican state of Nayarit. The municipal seat had a population of 8,819 in 2005.

In 2023, Ahuacatlán was designated a Pueblo Mágico by the Mexican government, recognizing its cultural and historical importance.

== Geography ==
It is located in the southeastern part of the state and has boundaries with the following municipalities: in the north with San Pedro Lagunillas, Santa María del Oro and Jala; in the south with the state of Jalisco and the municipality of Amatlán de Cañas; in the east with Ixtlán del Río, Jala and Amatlán de Cañas; and in the west with San Pedro Lagunillas.

The area of the municipality is 466.60 square kilometers and the population was 14,114 in 2005. The municipal seat had a population of 8,819 in 2005.

== Etymology ==
The name Ahuacatlán, means "place where there is a lot of avocado", coming from the Nahuatl words "Tlan", which means place; and "Ahua" which means "avocado".

== Economy ==
The main economic activity is agriculture with the growing of avocados, sugarcane, maize, sorghum, peanuts, and beans. There is also cattle and pig raising. Small industries produce molasses, tequila, and building materials.

== See also ==
- Municipalities of Nayarit
