= Xalisco =

Human settlement in Mexico

- Municipality
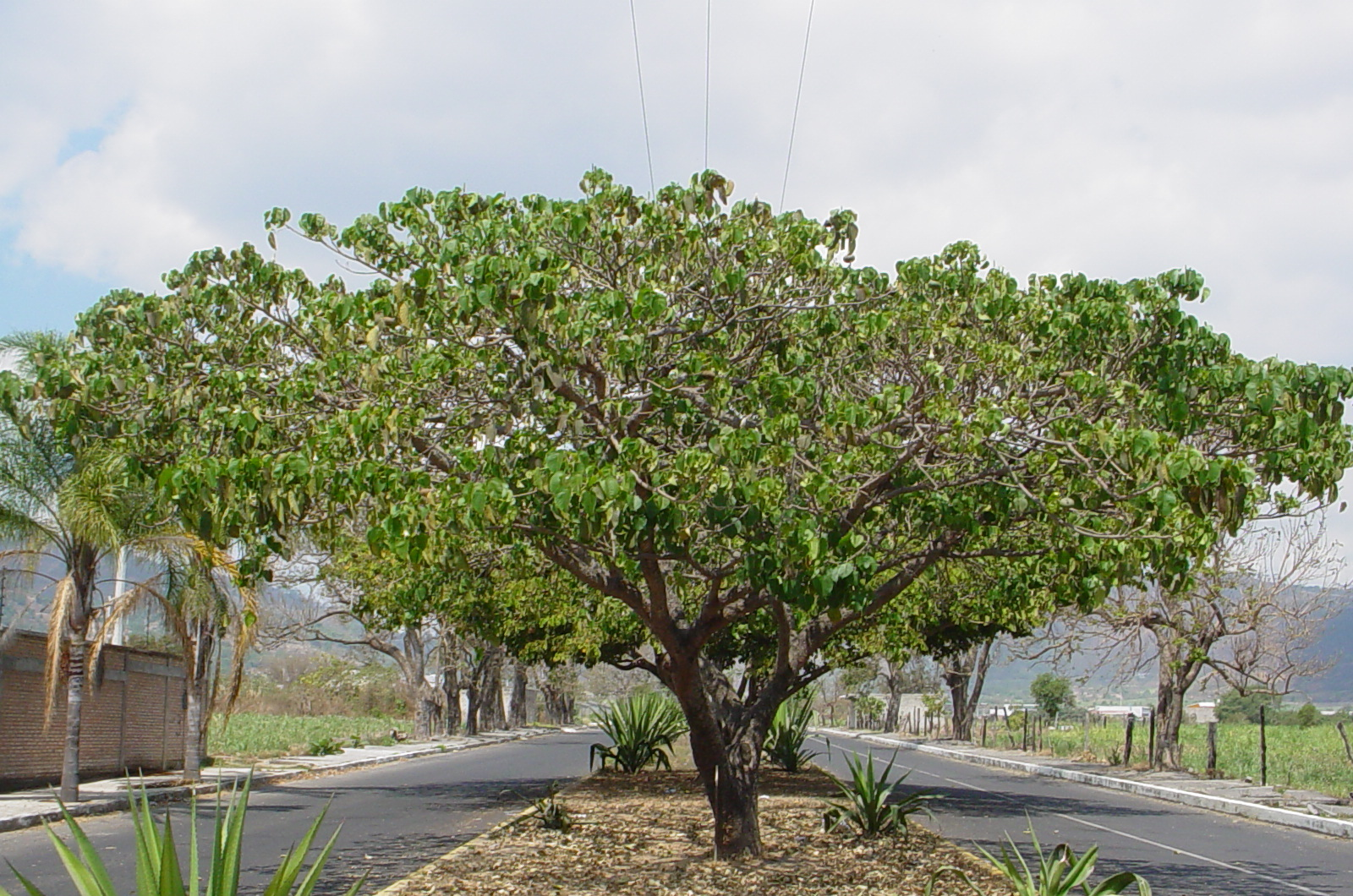

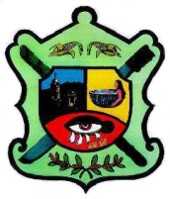
- Coat of arms

- Location in Mexico
- Country: Mexico
- State: Nayarit

Government
  - Federal electoral district: Nayarit's 3rd

Population (2020)
  - Total: 48,170
- Time zone: UTC-7 (Zona Pacífico)

Xalisco (Spanish pronunciation: [xaˈlisko]) is a city and its surrounding municipality of the same name in the Mexican state of Nayarit. The city had a population of 21,899 in the 2005 census while the municipality has an area of 290.6 km^{2} (112.2 sq mi) and a population of 42,893. The municipality lies adjacent to the south side of Tepic, the state capital, and is part of the Tepic metropolitan area. On the north it borders the municipality of Tepic, on the south the municipality of Compostela; on the east the municipality of Santiago Ixcuintla and on the west the municipality of San Blas.

== Sister cities ==
Xalisco has one sister city, as designated by Sister Cities International:

- (United States) Taos, New Mexico, U.S.
