= Ixtlán del Río =

- City and municipality
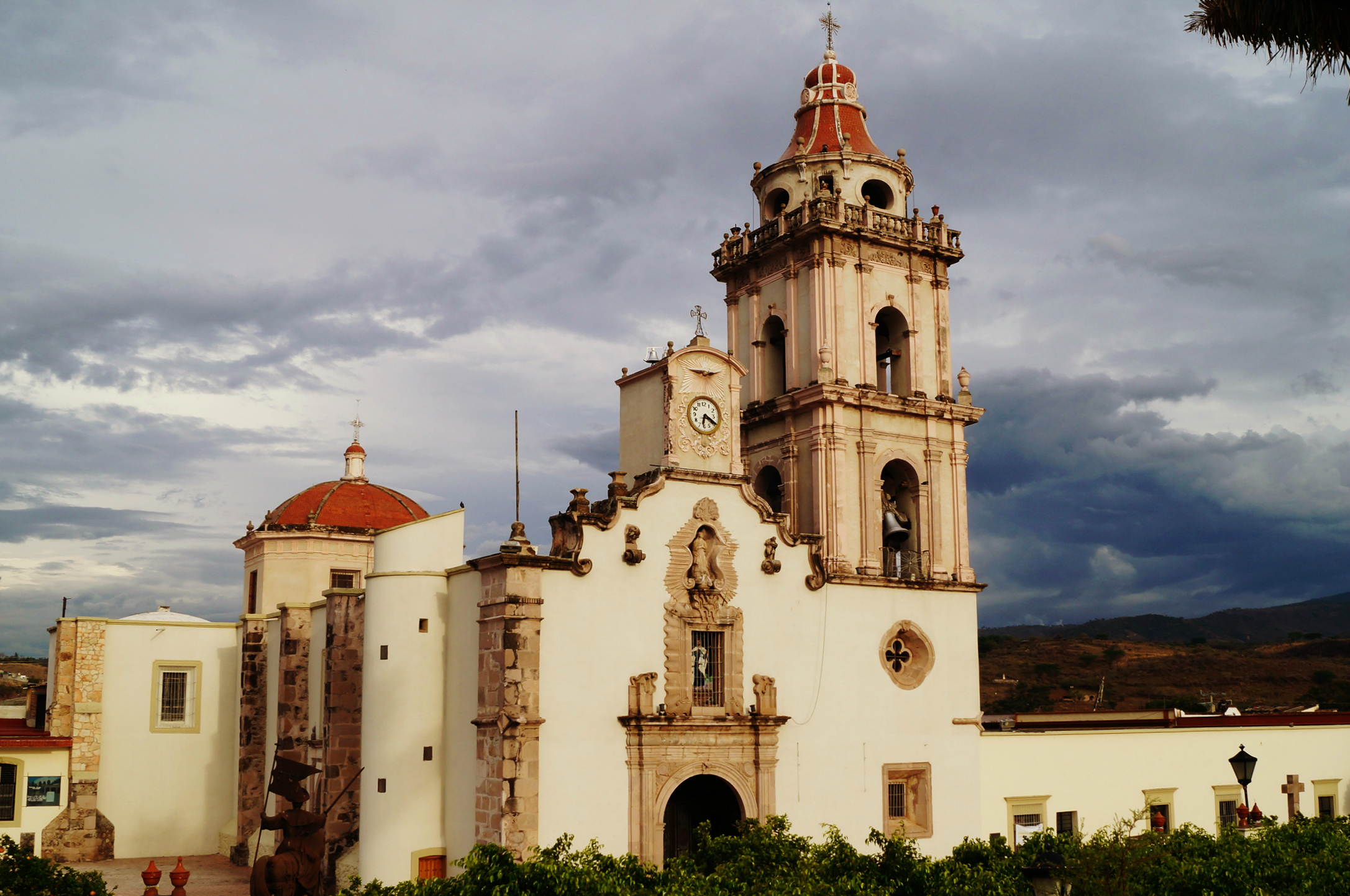
- Church in Ixtlán del Río

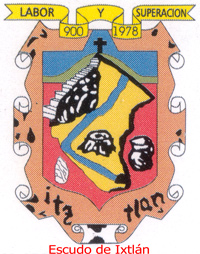
- Coat of arms

- Ixtlán del Rio, Nayarit
- Coordinates: 21.03°N 104.37°W
- Country: Mexico
- State: Nayarit

Government
  - Federal electoral district: Nayarit's 3rd

Population (2020)
  - Total: 25,477
  - Municipality: 30,951
- Time zone: UTC−7 (Zona Pacífico)

Ixtlán del Río (Spanish pronunciation: [iksˈtlan]) is both a municipality and the municipal seat in the Mexican state of Nayarit. In 2018, the population of the municipality was 33,289, with 35,180 residents living in the municipal seat. The total area of the municipality is 581.4 km^{2} (224.5 sq mi).

In 2023, Ixtlán was designated a Pueblo Mágico by the Mexican government, recognizing its cultural and historical importance.

Ixtlán, as it is known to locals, is located 149 kilometers south of the state capital Tepic and is connected to that city and Guadalajara by both rail and highway connections. The important coastal highway Route 15 passes through the city, while a toll road passes to the east.

Ixtlán has boundaries with the municipalities of La Yesca and Jala in the north; Amatlán de Cañas and the state of Jalisco in the south, Jalisco in the east and Ahuacatlán in the west.

The land is mainly mountainous (60%) with some flat lands near the small rivers where the agricultural lands and settlements are located. The climate is hot and sub-humid with rains falling from March to July. The average annual temperature varies between 21 °C and 25 °C, with maximum lows of 0 °C and highs of 48 °C. The average annual rainfall is around 859.8 mm.

The economy is based on services, due to the town's location on the important Mexico-Nogales highway, small industries (brickworks, furniture, pottery), and agriculture. The main crops are maize, sorghum, beans, and green chile. There were about 36,000 head of cattle in 1995.

East of the city lies Toriles, the most important archaeological site in northwestern Mexico. Here is found the temple of Quetzalcoatl, from the Toltec culture. The ceramic and gold jewelry extracted here can be seen in the Regional Museum of Ixtlán.

The Río Grande de Santiago crosses the eastern edge of the municipality but is not to be confused with the larger Río Grande de Santiago of the same name that flows from Jalisco into Nayarit.

== Etymology ==
The name of Ixtlán is of Náhuatl origin, composed of the words itztli meaning obsidian, and tlán, meaning "place". So the name means "place where obsidian is found", or "place of the obsidian knife."

== Geography ==
The land upon which the city lies sits atop the Trans-Mexican Volcanic Belt and is defined by the volcano El Molcajete, and the hills known as Las Panochas, El Borrego, and Mezquites. The city has two rivers: the Río Grande de Santiago that originates in the Pajaritos Mountains, and the Río Chico which originates in the mountains of Juanacatán. The area has multiple seasonal streams, including El Cofradía, Los Limones, Los Sauces, Arroyo Verde, San Miguel, El Pilareño, and 17 springs, the most well known of which is the hot springs called 'Agua Caliente'. Mining is found on the hills known as Los Mezquites, La Higuerita, and La Casteñana, with silver, lead, zinc, and opals the primary products.

=== Flora and fauna ===
In the surrounding Pajaritos Mountains commonly found trees include pine, oak, cypress, and other varieties. At lower elevations mesquite, guamúchil, huizaches, and nopal cactus are common, and near the rivers willow and fig trees are common. Indigenous animals include coyotes, deer, javelina (peccary), badgers, and hares. Birds include the goldfinch, painted urraca, and woodpecker. The municipality counts reserves of exploitable minerals and forests, but they are difficult to access. Cattle is run on approximately 17,419 hectares of land, and 9,061 hectares are devoted to agriculture. Approximately 47% is private property, and 42% belongs to ejidos.

=== Climate ===
Climate data for Ixtlán del Río
Month	Jan	Feb	Mar	Apr	May	Jun	Jul	Aug	Sep	Oct	Nov	Dec	Year
Mean daily maximum °C (°F)	29.2 (84.6)	30 (86)	32.1 (89.8)	34.4 (93.9)	35.4 (95.7)	34.5 (94.1)	32.6 (90.7)	32.4 (90.3)	32.0 (89.6)	32.0 (89.6)	31.2 (88.2)	29.3 (84.7)	32.1 (89.8)
Mean daily minimum °C (°F)	6.5 (43.7)	6.6 (43.9)	7.7 (45.9)	9.7 (49.5)	12.6 (54.7)	15.7 (60.3)	16.6 (61.9)	16.7 (62.1)	16.2 (61.2)	14.7 (58.5)	10.6 (51.1)	8 (46)	11.8 (53.2)
Average precipitation mm (inches)	18 (0.7)	10 (0.4)	5.1 (0.2)	5.1 (0.2)	13 (0.5)	160 (6.3)	240 (9.5)	220 (8.7)	150 (5.8)	51 (2)	10 (0.4)	13 (0.5)	890 (35.1)
Source: Weatherbase

== History ==
=== Pre-Columbian History ca. 14,000 BCE-1525 CE ===
Humans have inhabited the region since the migrations of the Paleo-Indians, but Native Americans known as Chimalhuacans, a tribe of Nahuatl-Toltec origin, arrived in the region c. 850 C.E. Obsidian artifacts, used for religious ceremonies or weapons, have been found and the volcanic soils and minerals likely added to the desirability of the location for settlement. Existent tribes in the region of Nayarit adopted the influences of the culture and constructed a ceremonial center, known today as Los Toriles, located approximately 1,500 meters from the center of the modern town.

The primary god of the prehispanic culture of the settling culture was Quetzalcoatl, or the feathered serpent, personified as a young warrior. In the 12th century C.E. the town was culturally aligned with the Valley of Mexico and was closely related to the settlements of Cacalutan and Ahuacatlan. The ruins known as 'Los Toriles' is the principal archaeological site of the state of Nayarit, and one of the most important archaeological sites in Western Mexico due to its elaborate buildings, numerous burial sites, and clay figures. The principal temple is of circular construction and was dedicated to Ehécatl, god of the wind. It is a unique construction, approximately 25 meters in diameter. Included in the building complex is a building of two levels that was constructed to avoid floods.

The prehispanic population of the region maintained workshops for the manufacturing of obsidian objects, including arrowheads and knives for hunting, which were used in trade. Tripod vases, smooth pottery painted with distinct shades of red, gold, silver, and copper adornments, stone statues of the god Chacmool, and quadrupedal animals. The region still has many unexplored tombs and archaeological sites.

=== European conquest 1525-1550 C.E. ===
Conquistador and explorer Francisco Cortés de San Buenaventura first entered the region in 1525, departing from Colima. In Ixtlán it is reported that he met with a Spanish adventurer by the name of Escárcena, who had explored the region on his own account. Initial contact was cordial and peaceful according to the first encomendero Martín Alonso. Nuño Beltrán de Guzmán conquered and destroyed the principal towns of the region in 1532 after having established himself president of the Real Audiencia established in Tepic, to the northwest of Ixtlán. The establishment of Tepic as a seat of the province of Nueva Galicia on July 25, 1532, was part of a wider conquest of the northwestern region of Mexico in the early 16th century. Due to the quality of the workmanship of artisans in Ixtlán, its location along established merchant routes, and the richness of its mineral resources, the town acquired regional importance. According to documents, Don Hernán Cortés stayed in the city when he traveled to Tepic to address complaints against Beltrán de Guzmán. The conquest of the region by Beltrán de Guzmán was reported to be unnecessarily brutal and violent, and he was eventually arrested and sent back to Spain for his reported abuses, although the sources of information on his behavior were written primarily by his political enemies, including Hernán Cortés.

=== Colonial era 1550-1810 C.E. ===
During the colonial era development of agricultural land followed similar patterns to those found in central Mexico, with Europeans introducing the portmanteau biota of Europe and Africa, including sugar cane and cattle. Due to its location along the trade routes between Tepic, which at the time was the capital of Nueva Galicia, San Blas and Guadalajara and Mexico City, the town maintained it size and economy. In the nearby mountainous areas of Mezquites and La Higuerita the Spaniards established mines. According to local history, the first Spaniard in Ixtlan settled in an area known today as 'La Haciendita', and after 1650 CE the original location was changed.

=== The 19th century ===
Francisco Severo Maldonado, a priest from Tepic, fought in the Independence Movement with fellow priest Miguel Hidalgo, and in 1821 signed el Acta de Independencia in Ixtlán. In 1825 a municipality was formed as a Department of Ahuacatlán, and in 1828 the town was officially named Villa de Ixtlán. On October 25, 1858, after a political pronouncement for the liberals, Ixtlán was burned and occupied by the conservative forces of Manuel Lozada, whose followers were left in peace until General Carbo marched against them in 1876, three years after the execution by firing squad of the local caudillo. By virtue of a political realignment and division made by the new Tepic Territory, in 1885 Ixtlán was named as a subprefecture.

=== The 20th century and contemporary times ===
During the centennial celebration of the declaration of independence, in 1910, the previously named Villa de Ixtlán was elevated to the status of a city as a recognition of its growth. In March, 1911, a local leader named Martín Espinosa publicly declared his loyalty to the Maderistas and started the insurrection against Mexican Federalist forces. After the Mexican Revolution, the Constitution of 1917 was ratified, and Tepic was declared a free and sovereign state of the Republic of Mexico. Ixtlán was declared to be Ixtlán del Río, one of the state's 17 municipalities in a political reorganization, and the first municipal president was Nicolás Castillo Castillón.

Between the 1920s and 1930s, Mexico was recovering from the Mexican Revolution, and was also affected by global trends such as World War I, the Russian Revolution, the Great Depression, and industrialization. Mexicans also struggled with one another in the Cristero War, a conflict between the federal government and Catholic groups. In March 1925 the Pacific Railroad was completed, connecting Ixtlán del Río with the western, coastal, and central parts of Mexico. In April 1925, for political reasons, Ixtlán del Río was declared the capital of Nayarit for ten days under governor Ismael Romero Gallardo. Ixtlán was the scene of many skirmishes during the Cristero War, with fighting spilling over from neighboring state Jalisco. The citizens of Ixtlán built a statue on top of a hill near the center of town known as Cristo el Rey in the aftermath of that conflict. On June 3, 1932 an earthquake damaged the tower of the Catholic Church in Ixtlán, the current church is a reconstruction built on the original structure. The political leaders of Ixtlán after the Revolution were members of the PRI party, as was common throughout Mexico. This did not change until 1996.

Between the 1940s and 1960s Mexico experienced a period of peace, economic growth, wealth redistribution, migration to cities, and modernization. This was reflected in Ixtlán with the construction of the Tepic-Guadalajara highway in 1942, which connected roadways in Ixtlán with other highways in Mexico. The road largely followed the 'Camino Real' established by the Spaniards on existing trade routes that had been used by the Native Americans. The road was the heart of the commercial district of Ixtlán. It is possible that during this era there was a redistribution of agricultural land by the federal government.

Between the 1970s and contemporary times Ixtlán modernized and was influenced by international trends such as globalization, advances in medicine, mechanization of agriculture, and the development of electronic communication. In 1994 the autopista, a high-speed highway, was constructed according to the Plan de Barrancas. The toll road allowed for modern amenities and increased traffic, but bypassed the center of Ixtlán, diminishing the amount of traffic that flowed through the commercial district. In 1996 voters elected the first mayor that was not a member of the PRI party, reflecting national political trends. Starting in the 1960s and 1970s many rural residents of Ixtlán and the surrounding towns began to migrate to cities or north to the United States, following a pattern of migration repeated by millions of their compatriots. Ixtlán maintains a large expatriate community in the American Southwest today, with many returning during Christmas holidays or as retirees.

== Overview ==
The center of the municipality is the city of Ixtlán del Río with a population of 28,000 inhabitants according to a 2014 estimate, which makes it the most populous city in the central south region. Notable locations within the city include El Cristo Rey, a statue of Jesus on top of a hill located just outside of the town center, the central parish Catholic Church, the central plaza and kiosk and the central market. The city offers financial services, sleeping accommodations, and a variety of commercial activities.

== Culture ==
=== Religion ===
Most residents follow the Catholic faith, two parish churches are maintained as well as different chapels and religious sites. Other faiths include evangelical Christianity, Seventh Day Adventists and Jehovah's Witnesses.

Catholic Churches or religious sites: Parroquia de Santiago Apóstol, Templo del Nuestra Señora del Carmen, Templo del Sagrario Corazón, Santuario de la Virgen de Guadalupe, Templo de Nuestra Señora del Perpetuo Socorro, Capilla de Nuestra Señora del Rosario de Talpa, Capilla de Cristo Rey, Cuasi Parroquia de Mexpan San Juan Bautista, Templo de Nuestra Señora de Fátima, Parroquia de Cristo Rey, Templo de San Felipe de Jesús, Templo de San Andrés

=== Festivals and traditions ===
The regional fair is held between September 7 and 18 and includes agricultural expositions, rodeos, folkloric dancers and musicians, fireworks, and a parade with floats. The feast of the Virgin of Guadalupe is celebrated between December 7 and 15, and a gathering to climb El Cristo Rey takes place in October. Smaller outlying pueblos also hold fiestas, rodeos, and smaller celebrations on an annual basis.

=== Music and style ===
The Cora and Huichol still play their traditional music in the region of Ixtlan, but most live outside of the city proper. Popular forms of music in Ixtlan are similar to music from the wider region, and include Mariachi, Banda, Norteno, and Cumbia. The prevalent style of dress is conservative and sourced from large manufacturers. A prevalent style is close to Western wear seen in the Western parts of the United States, with cowboy hats, boots, leather belts, jeans, and pickup trucks. Men commonly wear their hair short, and sport mustaches, women dress conservatively, wear their hair long, and dress according to Western norms, not dissimilar to what would be seen in Mexico City or Guadalajara.

=== Museums ===
The Museum of Anthropology is located in the interior of the municipal presidency. Anthropomorphic figures are displayed there, including warriors, obsidian carvings, and pottery. They largely belong to the Classic Era (300-900 C.E.). La Casona de Ixtlán is a cultural space with a small museum that displays found objects from antiquity and an art gallery that displays work from local artists such as Manuel Benítez. It is an open forum for international artists, and also serves food and wine.

=== Education ===
Ixtlan maintains public and private school systems from preschool up to the university level, with satellite schools from larger institutions.

=== Tourism ===
Four kilometers east of town there is a small water park called La Sidra, it is based on a hot spring with reported curative powers. On a hill overlooking the town there is a statue dedicated to Jesus called El Cristo Rey, with access for automobiles and 544 steps for those wishing to walk. There are a variety of smaller springs, both hot and cold, throughout the municipality. Throughout the municipality private ranches and sites can be found for lodging or recreation. Local artisans produce arts and crafts that are sold throughout the city and in the plaza, they include leather articles, glassware, pottery, and textile based products. The regional gastronomy is based on beef, but includes a fair amount of seafood due to a relative proximity to the coast. Some typical dishes include birria, which is stewed beef or goat meat, carne asada which is grilled beef in a variety of forms, and ceviche which is fish or other seafood marinated in lime juice, served with mixed vegetables. Ixtlan is near to the tequila producing region of Mexico, and the liquor is commonly served.

== Government ==
=== Municipal presidents ===
Term	Municipal president	Political party	Notes
1917-1918	Nicolás Castillo Castillón		
1919-1920	Alfredo de Santiago		
1921-1922	David Ortiz		
1923-1924	Francisco Ortiz Guevara		
1925-1926	Fictoroano González		
1927	José de Jesús González Jaime		
1928	Daniel Villanueva		
1928	Ángel Rocha Loza		
1929	Ramón García		
1929	Francisco Ortiz Guevara	PNR	
1930-1931	Manuel González R.	PNR	
1932	Melitón Bernal	PNR	
1932	Manuel González R.	PNR	
1933	Maximiliano Rivera	PNR	
1934	Eduardo López Vidrio	PNR	
1934	Darío Romero López	PNR	
1935-1936	Cenobio Guzmán	PNR	
1937-1938	Francisco Sandoval V.	PNR; PRM	
1939-1940	Salvador Parra González	PRM	
1941-1942	Francisco Parra González	PRM	
1943-1944	Francisco García Montero	PRM	
1945	Florentino Parra Camacho	PRM	Acting municipal president
1946-1948	Teófilo Hernández Velázquez	PRI	
1949-1951	Ezequiel González Jaime	PRI	
1952-1954	Francisco Béjar Mendoza	PRI	
1955-1957	Florentino Parra Camacho	PRI	
1958-1960	Apolinar Castillo Ocampo	PRI	
1961-1963	José Ramón Menchaca Cortés	PRI	
1964-1966	Antonio Becerra Sánchez	PRI	
1966	Alfonso Santana Gómez	PRI	
1967-1969	Emigdio Reyes Ruiz	PRI	
1970-1972	José Ramón Barragán Parra	PRI	
1973-1975	Guillermo Javier Uribe García	PRI	
1976-1978	J. Guadalupe Sánchez Jaime	PRI	
1978-1981	Marco Tulio Delgado Becerra	PRI	
1981-1984	José Ramón Parra Rivera	PRI	
1984-1987	Antonio Tovar Martínez	PRI	
1987-1990	Héctor Javier Sánchez Espinoza	PRI	
1990-1993	Ezequiel Parra Altamirano	PRI	
1993-1996	Ramón Parra Ibarra	PRI	
1996-1999	Salvador Muñoz Hernández	PAN	
1999-2002	José Antonio Ruiz Flores	PRI	
2002-2005	Héctor Javier Sánchez Fletes	Convergence	
2005-2008	Everardo Sánchez Parra	PRI	
2008-2011	Héctor Javier Sánchez Fletes	PAN	
2011-2014	Salvador Muñoz Hernández	PAN	
2014-2017	José Antonio Alvarado Valera	PRI; PVEM; Panal	Coalition "For the Good of Nayarit"
2017-2021	Juan Enrique Parra Pérez	MC	
17-09-2021-16-09-2024	Elsa Nayeli Pardo Rivera	PAN; PRI; PRD	Coalition "It Goes for Nayarit"
17-09-2024-	José Guillermo Ramírez Jiménez	PT; Morena; PVEM; Force for Mexico	

== See also ==
Municipalities of Nayarit
