= Nayarit =

State of Mexico

- State
- Free and Sovereign State of Nayarit; Estado Libre y Soberano de Nayarit (Spanish)
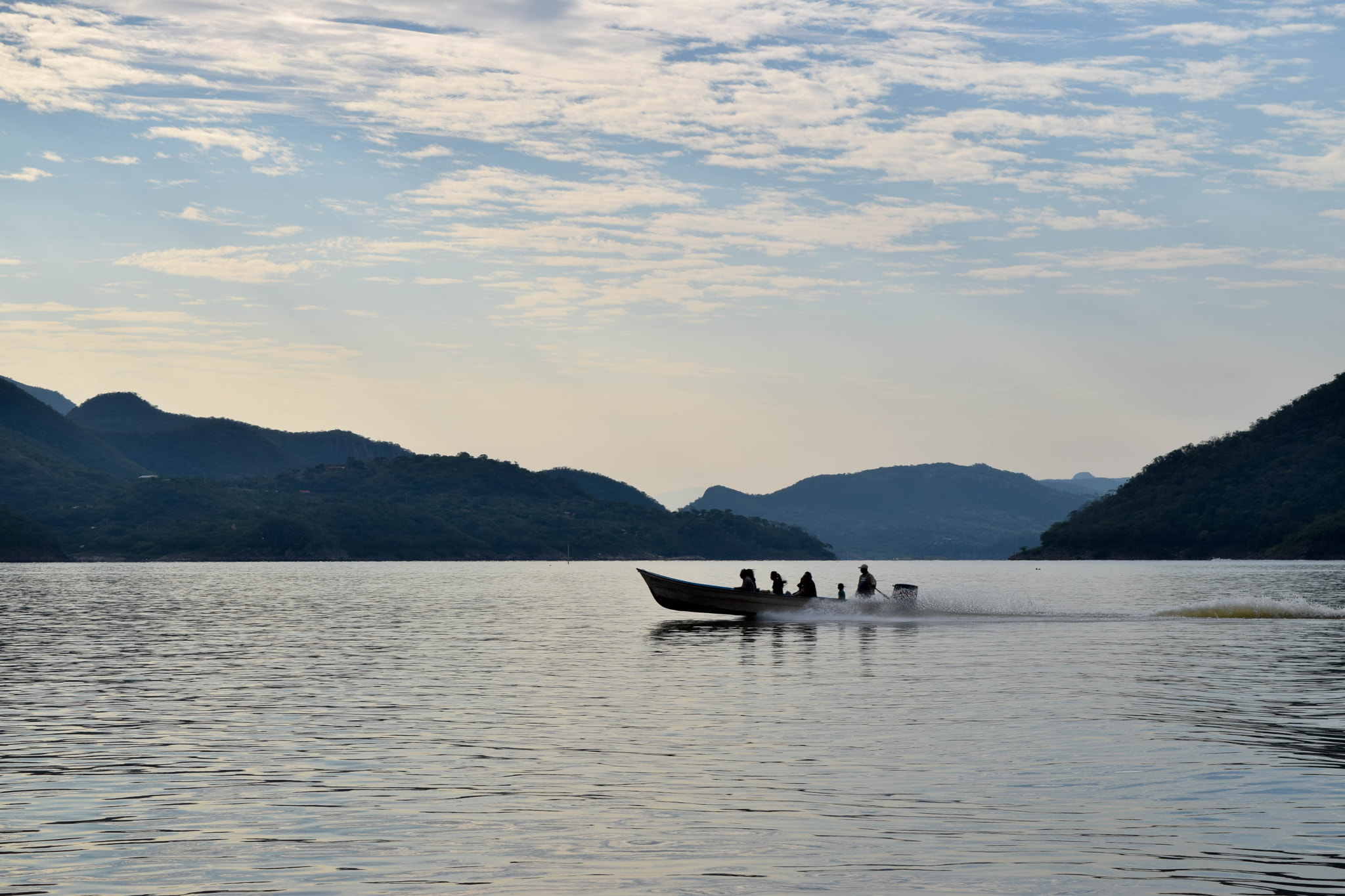
- The Aguamilpa Dam

- Coat of arms

- State of Nayarit within Mexico
- Coordinates: 22°N 105°W
- Country: Mexico
- Capital and largest city: Tepic
- Municipalities: 20
- Admission: 26 January 1917
- Order: 28th

Government
  - Governor: Miguel Ángel Navarro Quintero
  - Senators: Cora Cecilia Pinedo Alonso; Rosa Elena Jiménez Arteaga; Gloria Elizabeth Núñez Sánchez
  - Deputies: Federal deputies: • Félix Durán Ruiz (1st); • Jasmine María Bugarín Rodríguez (2nd); • Jorge Armando Ortíz Rodríguez (3rd)

Area
  - Total: 27,857 km^{2} (10,756 sq mi)
- Ranked 23rd
- Highest elevation: 2,760 m (9,060 ft)

Population (2020)
  - Total: 1,235,456
  - Rank: 29th
  - Density: 44.350/km^{2} (114.87/sq mi)
  - Rank: 23rd
- Demonym: Nayarita

GDP (2022)
  - Total: MXN 205 billion (US$10.2 billion)
  - Per capita: US$8,171
- Time zones: UTC−07:00 (Zona Pacífico)
- UTC–06:00 (Zona Centro)
- Postal code: 63
- Area code: Area codes: • 311; • 319; • 322; • 323; • 324; • 325; • 327; • 329; • 389
- ISO 3166 code: MX-NAY
- HDI: ▲0.789 high Ranked 16th of 32
- Website: Official website

Nayarit, (Note: Spanish pronunciation: [naʝaˈɾit]) officially the Free and Sovereign State of Nayarit, (Note: Spanish: Estado Libre y Soberano de Nayarit) is one of the 31 states that, along with Mexico City, comprise the Federal Entities of Mexico. It is divided in 20 municipalities and its capital city is Tepic.

It is bordered by the states of Sinaloa to the northwest, Durango to the north, Zacatecas to the northeast and Jalisco to the south. To the west, Nayarit has a significant share of coastline on the Pacific Ocean, including the islands of Marías and Marietas. The beaches of San Blas and the so-called "Riviera Nayarit" are popular with tourists and snowbirds. Besides tourism, the economy of the state is based mainly on agriculture and fishing. It is also one of two states where the tarantula species Brachypelma klaasi is found, the other being Jalisco.

Home to Uto-Aztecan indigenous peoples such as the Huichol and Cora, the region was exposed to the conquistadores Hernán Cortés and Nuño de Guzmán in the 16th century. Spanish governance was made difficult by indigenous rebellions and by the inhospitable terrain of the Sierra del Nayar. The last independent Cora communities were subjugated in 1722. The state is named after the Cora people's self-designation: Náayerite, commemorating Nayar, a resistance leader.

== History ==
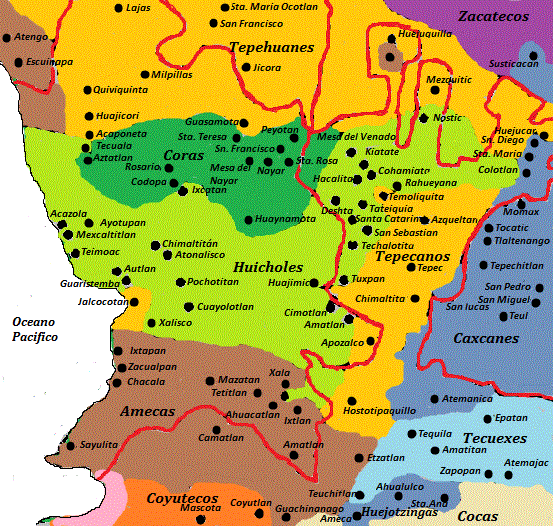
Map of Nayarit before the Spanish Conquest of the Aztec Empire

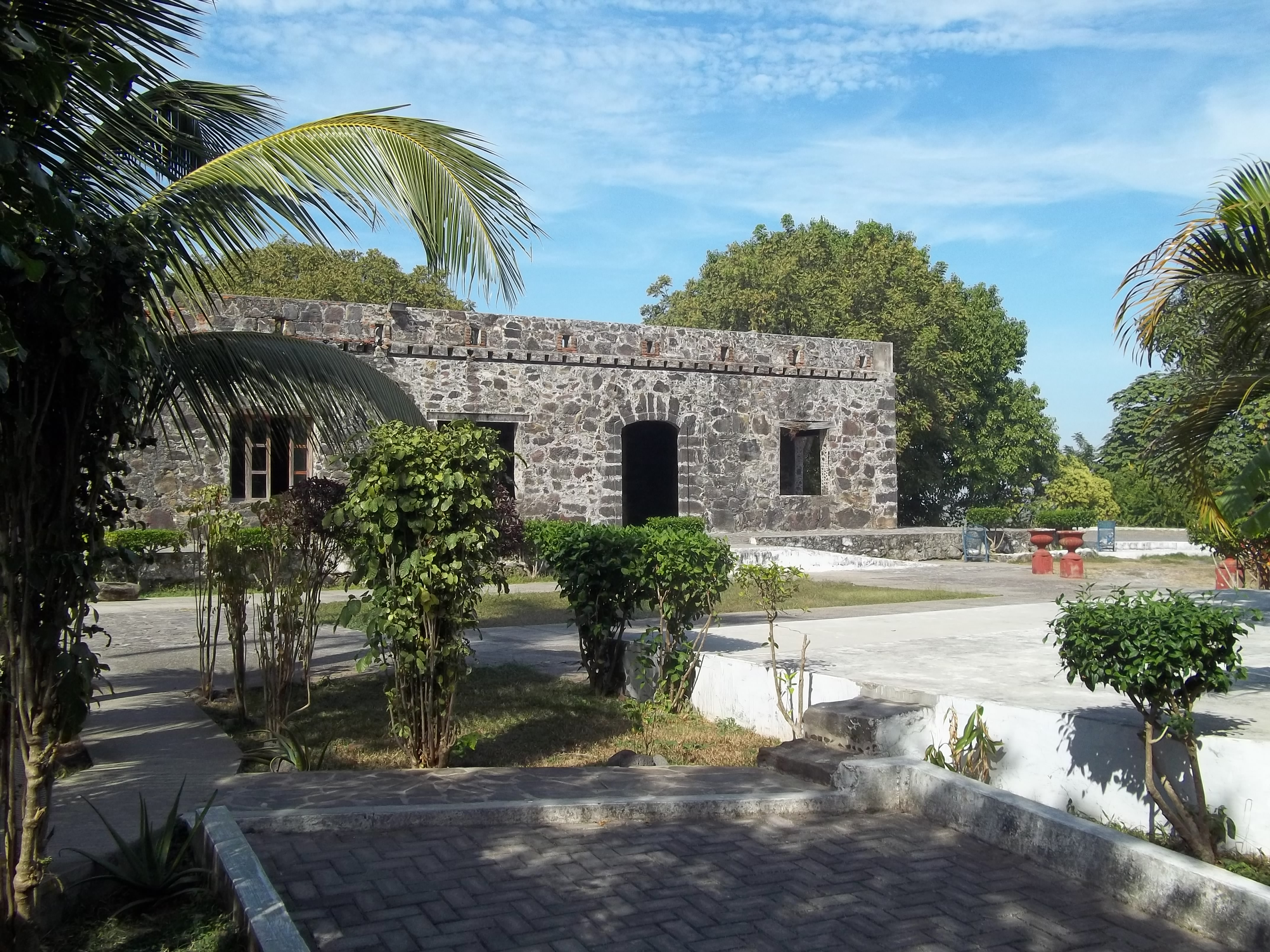
The colonial contaduría (accounting offices) in the old port town of San Blas

Radiocarbon dating estimate Aztatlán colonization of the western Mexican coast – including parts of Sinaloa, Nayarit and Jalisco – as occurring as early as 900 AD, with some evidence suggesting it might have been as early as 520 AD. Encountered on the western coast by the Spanish invaders in 1500, the cultures were descended from these original Aztatlán settlements and other Classic-stage cultures who had merged with them.

Hernán Cortés was the first known European to enter into the area now known as Nayarit, which he claimed for Spain as part of Nueva Galicia. Under Nuño de Guzmán, Spaniards took the region with considerable brutality, causing the indigenous inhabitants to revolt, in what was later referred to as the Mixtón War. After almost two centuries of resistance, the last independent Cora communities were incorporated into Spanish administration by force in 1722. Then followed intense missionary efforts by Jesuits to convert the indigenous.

In the colonial period, the port of San Blas was one of the most important trade ports on the American Pacific coast. Galleons transporting goods from Manila, the Philippines arrived here before the rise of the port of Acapulco. Today, the town still boasts colonial architecture from its heyday, such as the aduana (customs office), the contaduría (accounting offices) and the fortress that protected the port against pirates.

In Nayarit, the struggle for independence from Spain was initiated by the priest José María Mercado, who conquered Tepic and San Blas before being defeated and executed by Spanish royalists. In 1824, in the first constitution of the Mexican Republic, Nayarit was a part of Jalisco. In the mid-1800s Comanche Indians, from Texas and Oklahoma, attacked Tepic causing widespread destruction. During the second half of the 19th century, Nayarit was one of the most turbulent territories in Mexico. The population was in open revolt, demanding access to land.

Nayarit was one of the last territories admitted as a state of the Mexican federation, which occurred on 1 May 1917.

== Geography ==
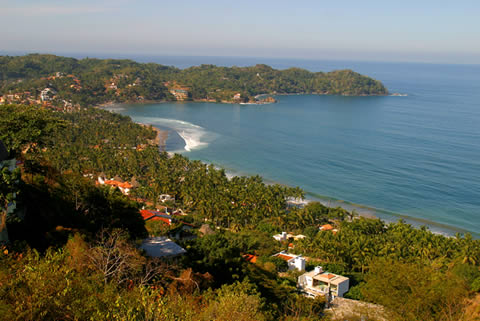
Sayulita on Nayarit's Pacific coast, a former fishing village now mostly given over to tourism, part of the area now marketed as "La Riviera Nayarit"

Nayarit covers 27,815 square kilometers (10,739 sq mi), making it one of the smaller states in Mexico. Nayarit is located between latitude lines 23°05' north and 20°36' south and longitude lines 103°43' east and 105°46' west. Its terrain is broken up by the western ends of the Sierra Madre Occidental mountains. Its highest mountains are: San Juan, Sanguangüey, El Ceboruco, Cumbre de Pajaritos and Picachos. Nayarit has two volcanoes, Ceboruco and Sangangüey. In the northeast are broad, tropical plains watered by the Río Grande de Santiago, a continuation of the Lerma River. The main state rivers are the Río Grande de Santiago, San Pedro Mezquital, Acaponeta, Ameca, and Las Cañas. The Río Grande de Santiago is the largest river in Nayarit. The Santiago and its tributaries are of major importance for agricultural irrigation. The Ameca and the Las Cañas lie on the border between Nayarit and the states of Jalisco and Sinaloa, respectively. Notable lagoons in Nayarit include Santa María del Oro, San Pedro Lagunillas and Agua Brava.

=== Municipalities ===
Nayarit – as with all states of Mexico – is geographically divided into municipalities (municipios), creating twenty municipalities in Nayarit:

- Acaponeta
- Ahuacatlán
- Amatlán de Cañas
- Bahía de Banderas
- Compostela
- El Nayar
- Huajicori
- Ixtlán del Río
- Jala
- La Yesca
- Rosamorada
- Ruíz
- San Blas
- San Pedro Lagunillas
- Santa María del Oro
- Santiago Ixcuintla
- Tecuala
- Tepic
- Tuxpan
- Xalisco

=== Environment ===
Nayarit's natural vegetation varies with altitude; coastal lowlands and river valleys were, historically, covered with tropical dry forest, containing many native deciduous trees that lost their leaves during the dry seasons. The Sinaloan dry forests now cover the northern coastal lowlands, and extend up the valleys of the San Pedro Mezquital River and the Río Grande de Santiago and its tributaries. The Jalisco dry forests ecoregion covers coastal Nayarit south of San Blas and the Islas Marías.

The Marismas Nacionales–San Blas mangroves, a network of coastal Pacific lagoons and tidal mangrove forests, extend along the state's northern coast and into adjacent Sinaloa state. The mangroves are home to abundant wildlife, including migratory and resident waterbirds.

The mountains are home to pine–oak forests, which vary in density with elevation. Oak forests and woodlands tend to grow at lower elevations, interspersed with smaller areas of humid cloud forest in areas of higher rainfall. The highest elevations contain forests of conifers, pines and oak.

Nayarit also contains hundreds of miles of rainforest in the Sierra. Its wildlife includes hundreds of bird species, both resident and breeding/migratory populations, including parrots, like the lilac-crowned amazon (Amazona finschi) and numerous hummingbirds, such as the Mexican woodnymph (Thalurania ridgwayi). There are also 119 registered species of mammals, including white-tailed deer (Odocoileus virginianus), collared peccary (Dicotyles tajacu), brocket deer (Mazama americana), several types of armadillo, coyote, wild felines such as puma (Felis concolor), jaguarundi (Puma yagouarundi), bobcat or lince rojo, ocelot (Felis pardalis) and many more species. Historically, the Mexican wolf, Mexican grizzly bear and jaguar would have been present in the region, as well, though the bears are now extinct; the Mexican wolf and jaguar survive today only in a few fragmented locations, due to decades of hunting and human encroachment on their habitats. Most of the rain forest has been exploited, especially around the region of Santa María del Oro. The conservation and protection of the rain forest and wildlife of Nayarit is an issue of crucial importance.

The Islas Marías were designated as the Islas Marías Biosphere Reserve by UNESCO in 2010.

=== Flora and fauna ===
Flora and fauna of Nayarit

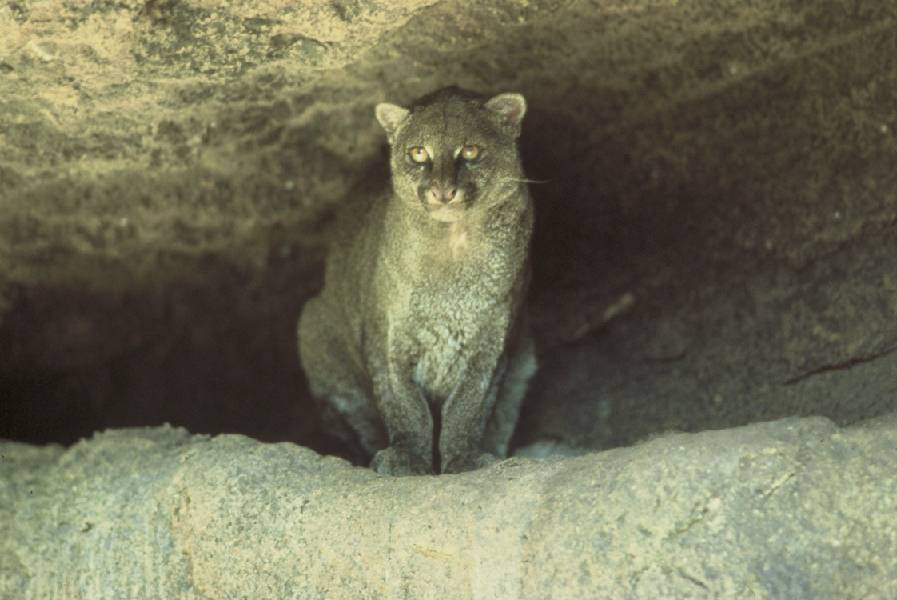
Puma yagouaroundi, eyra cat

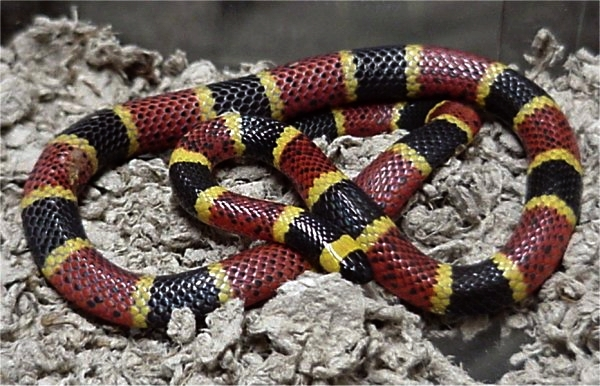
Micrurus, coral snake

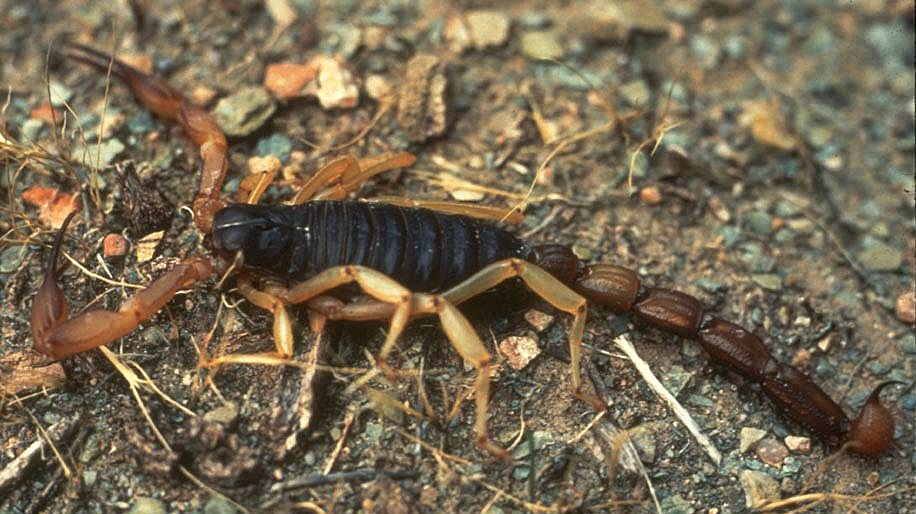
Centruroides suffusus, bark scorpion

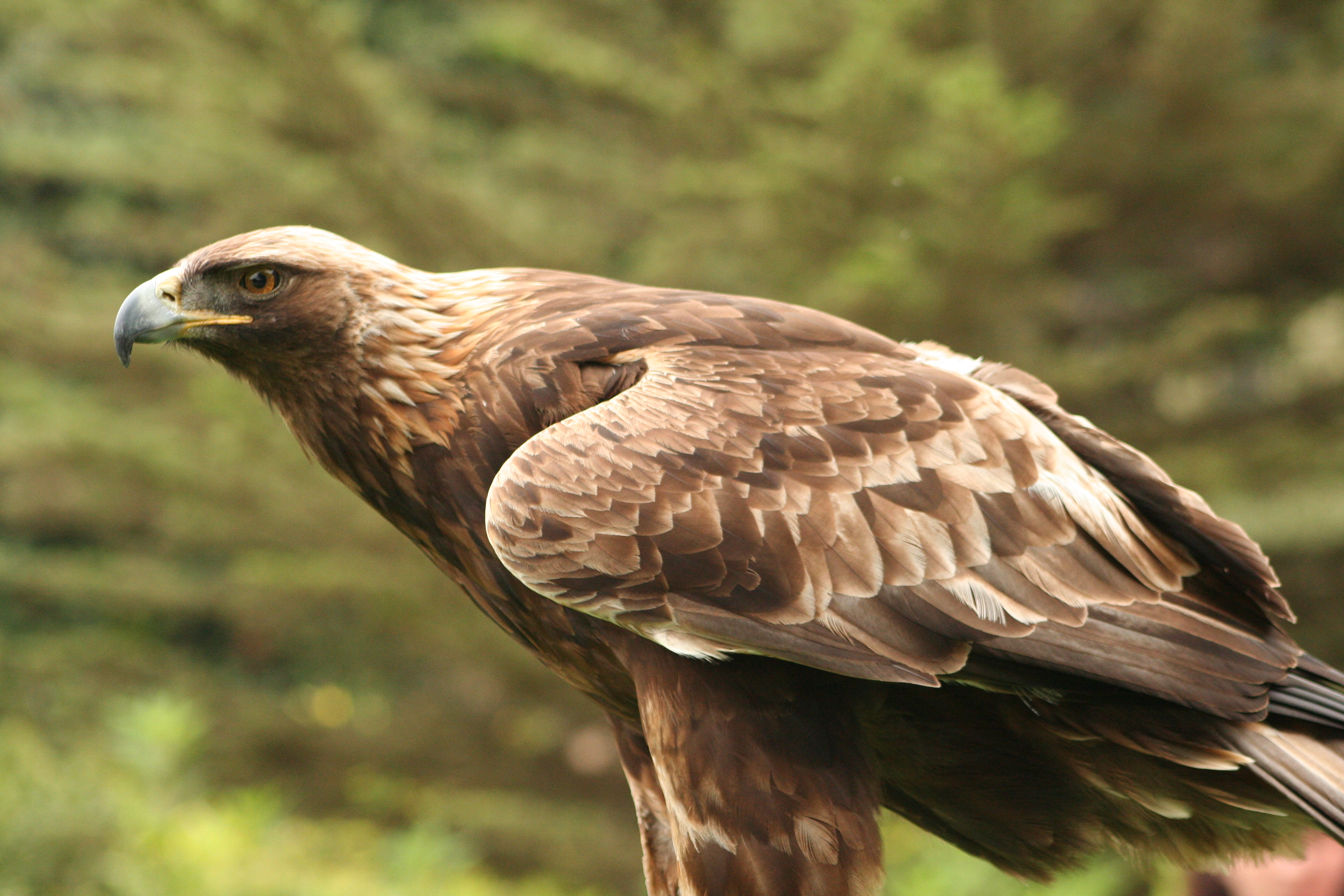
Aquila chrysaetos, golden eagle

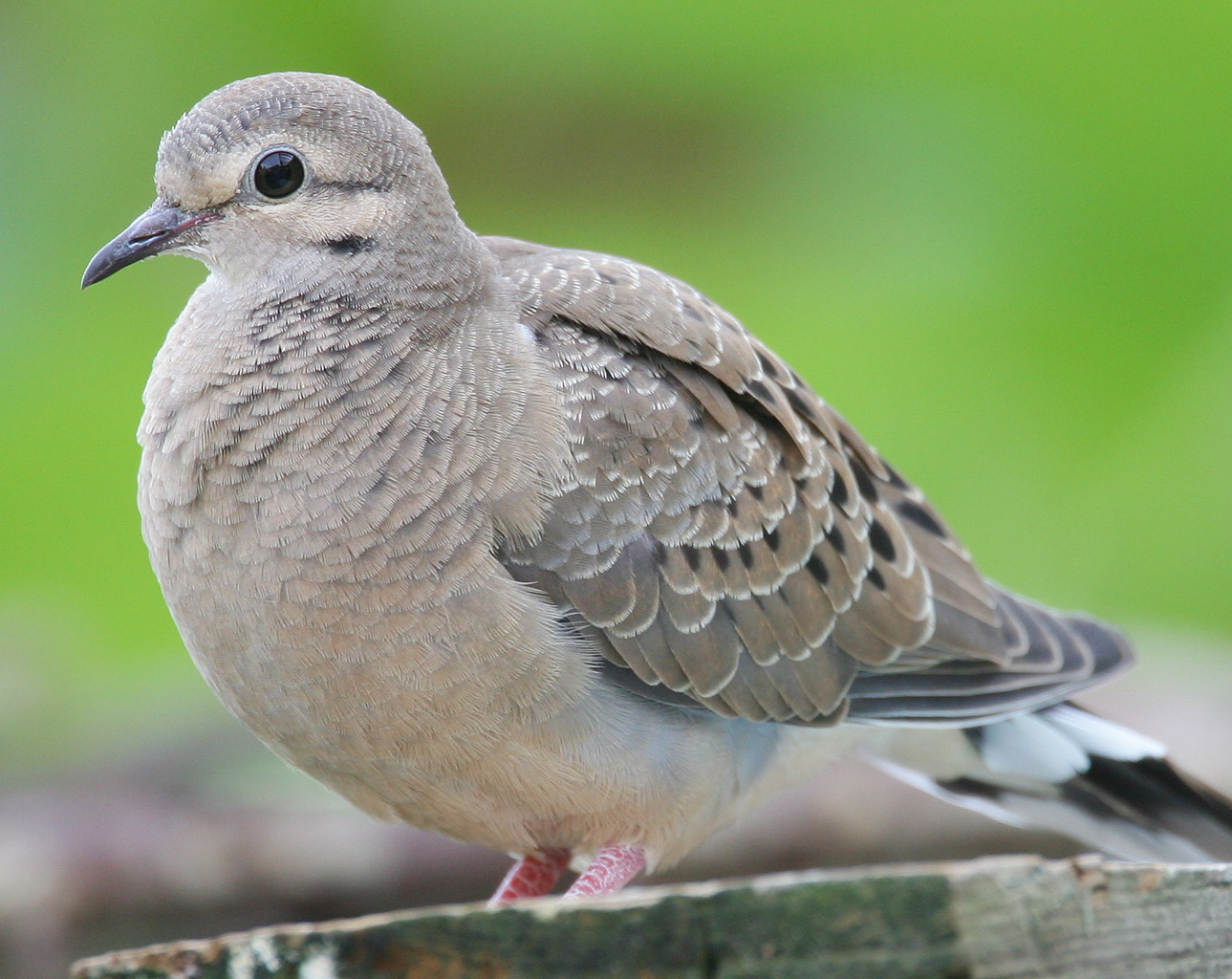
Zenaida macroura, mourning dove

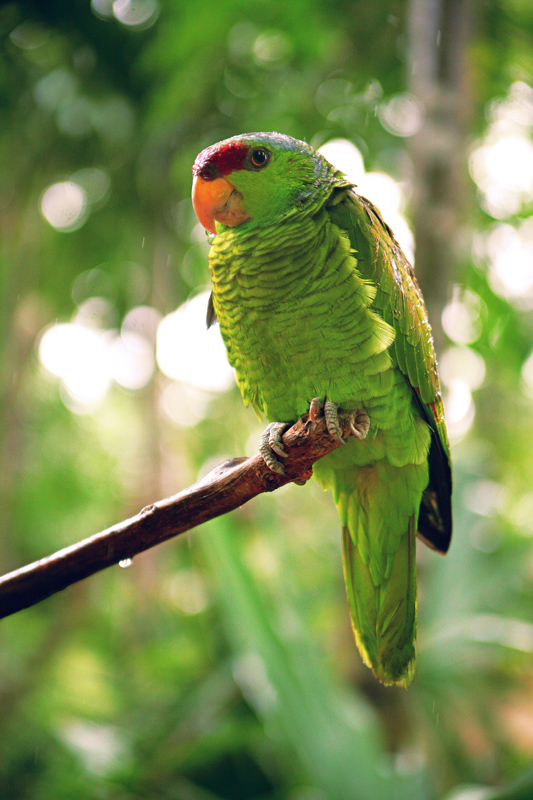
Amazona finschi, lilac-crowned amazon

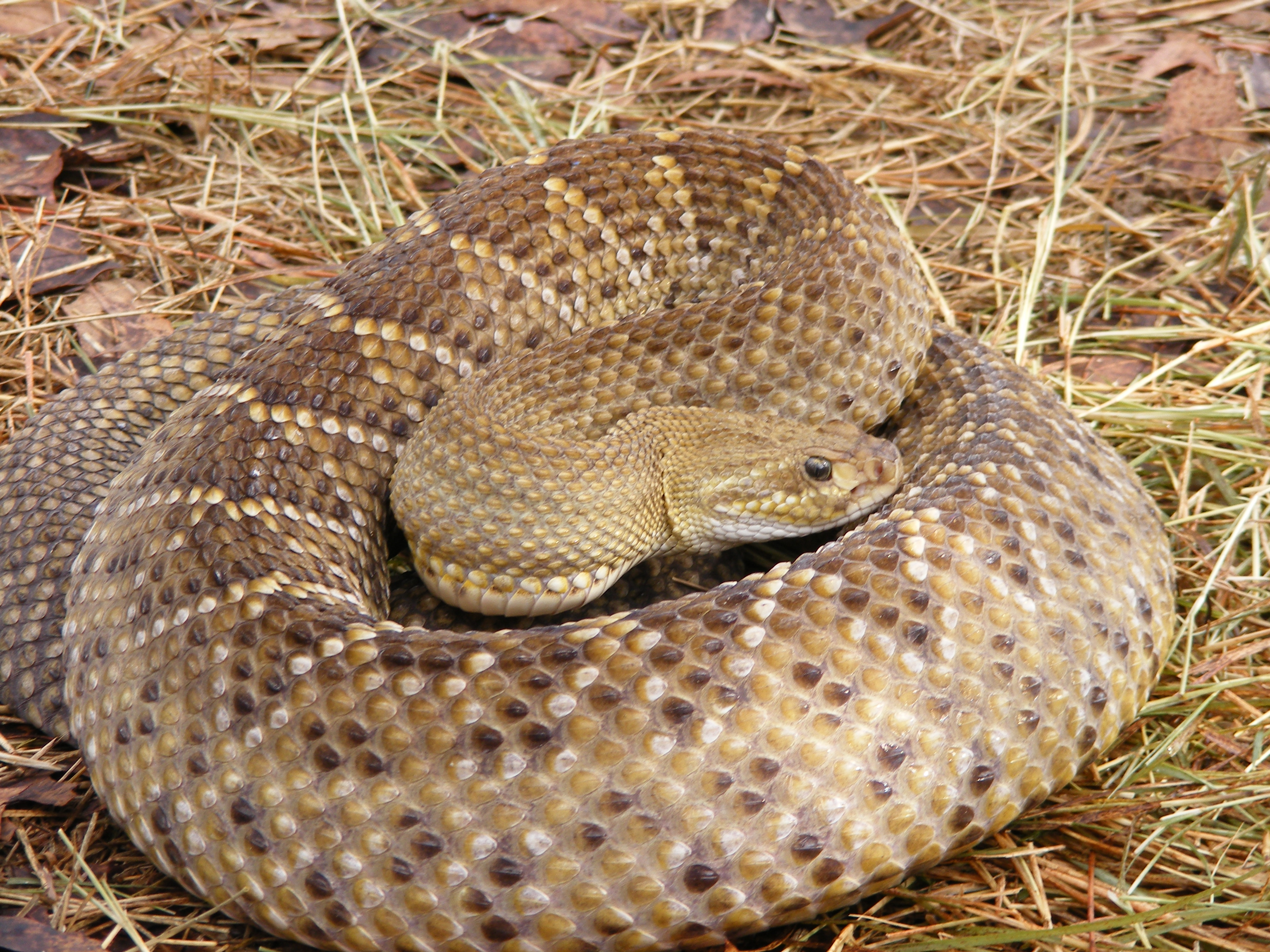
Crotalus basiliscus, green rattler

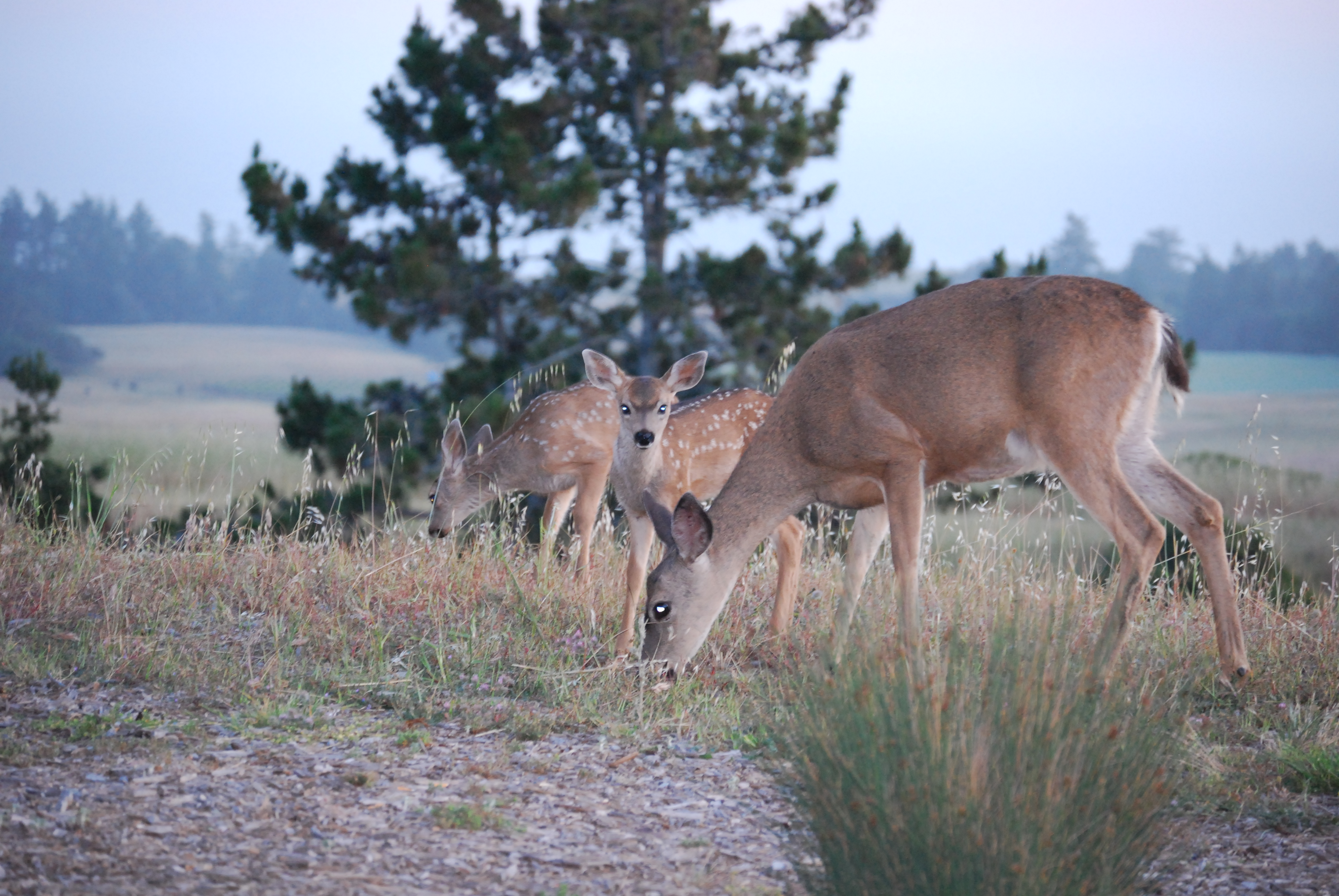
Odocoileus hemionus, mule deer

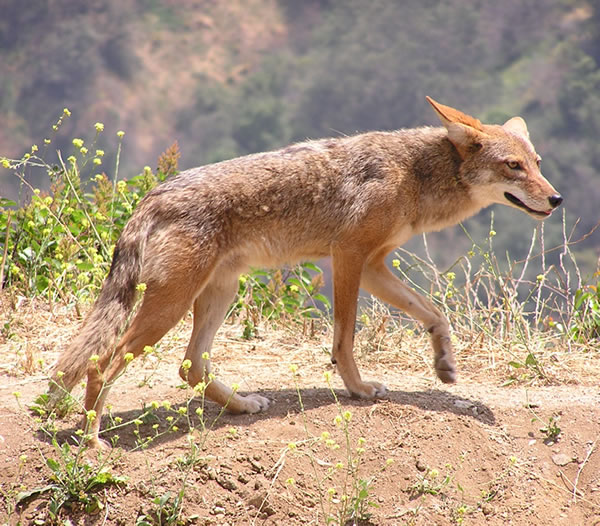
Canis latrans, coyote

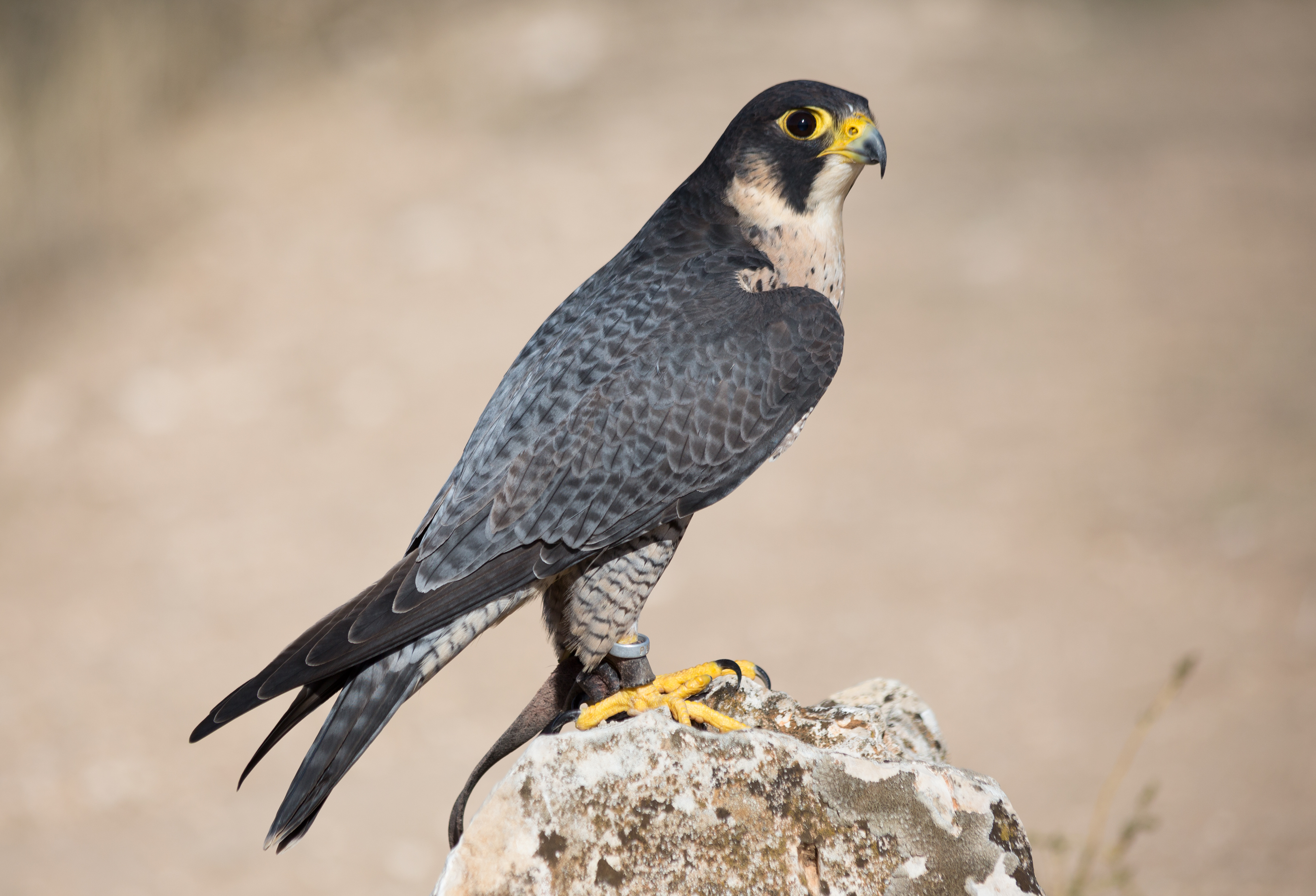
Falco peregrinus, peregrine

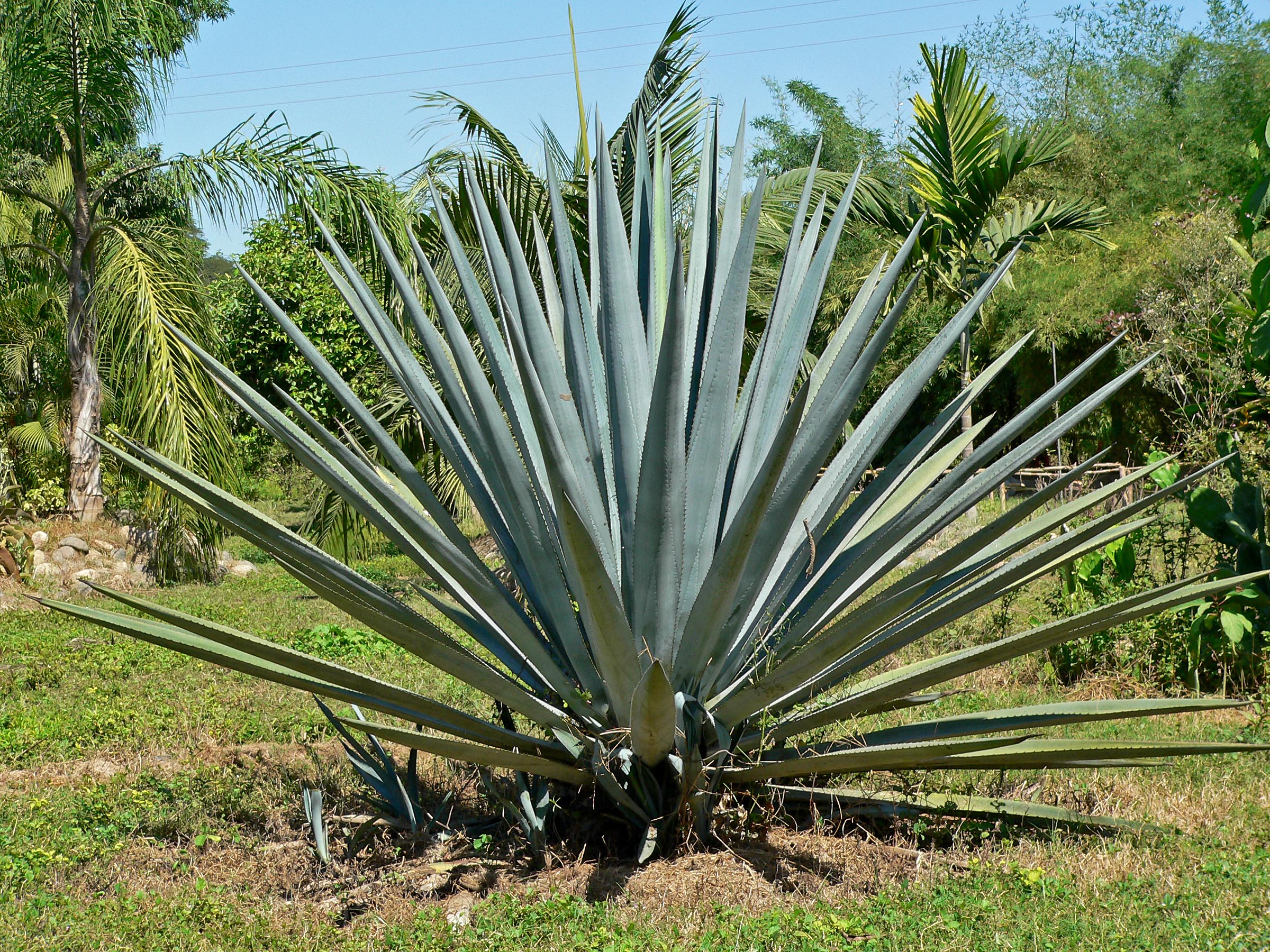
Agave tequilana, tequila agave

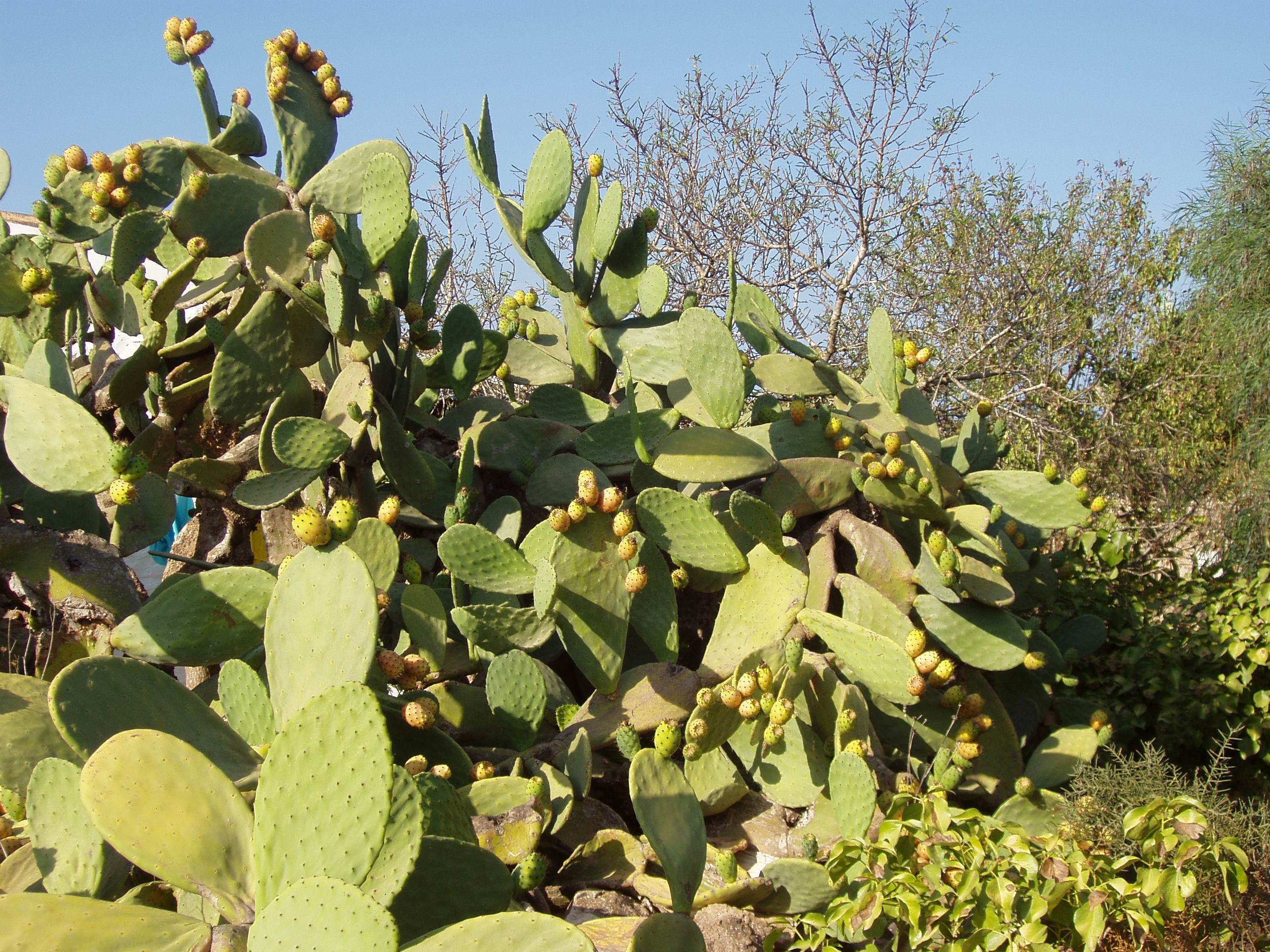
Opuntia ficus-indica, cactus pear

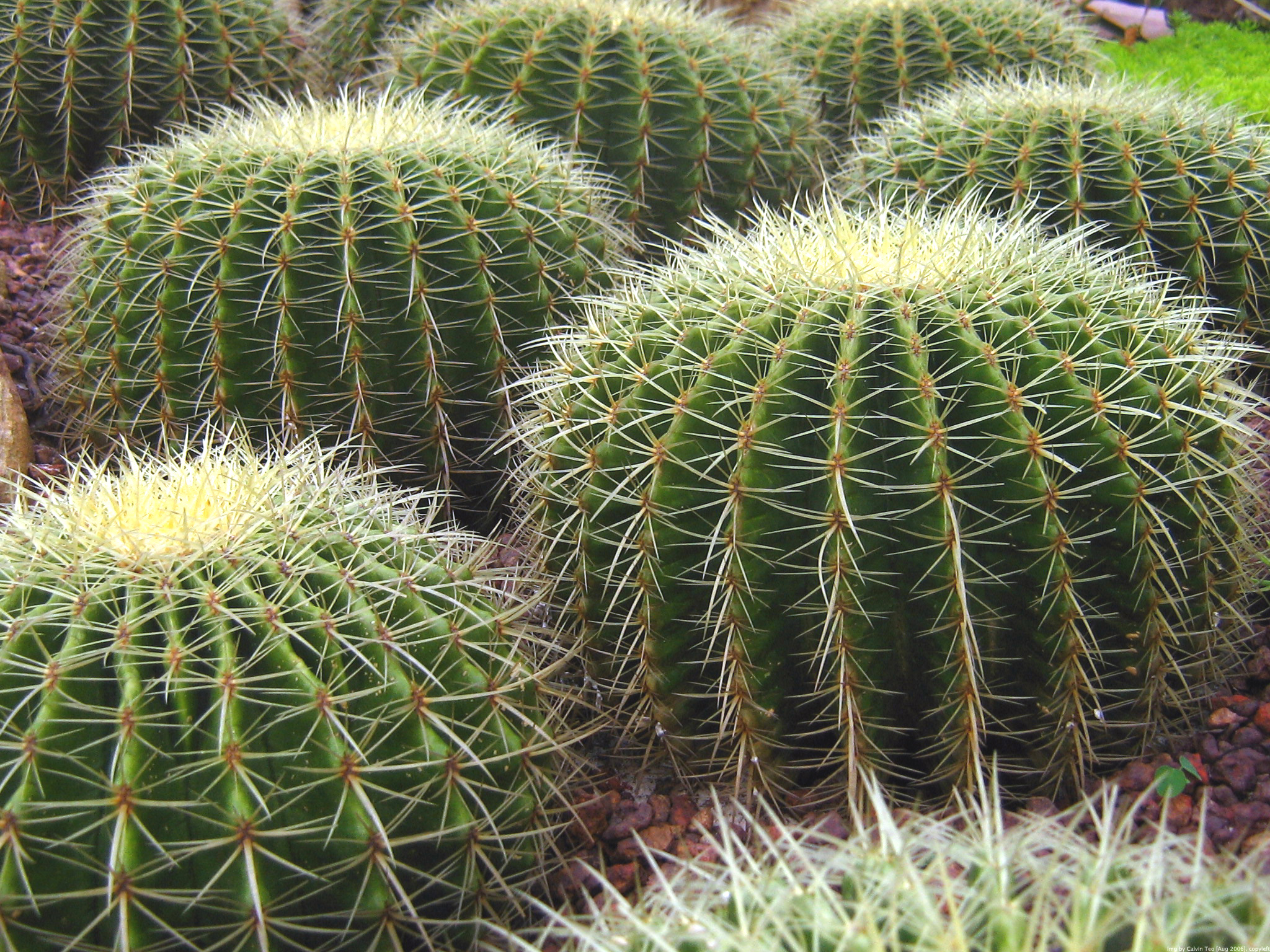
Echinocactus grusonii, golden barrel cactus

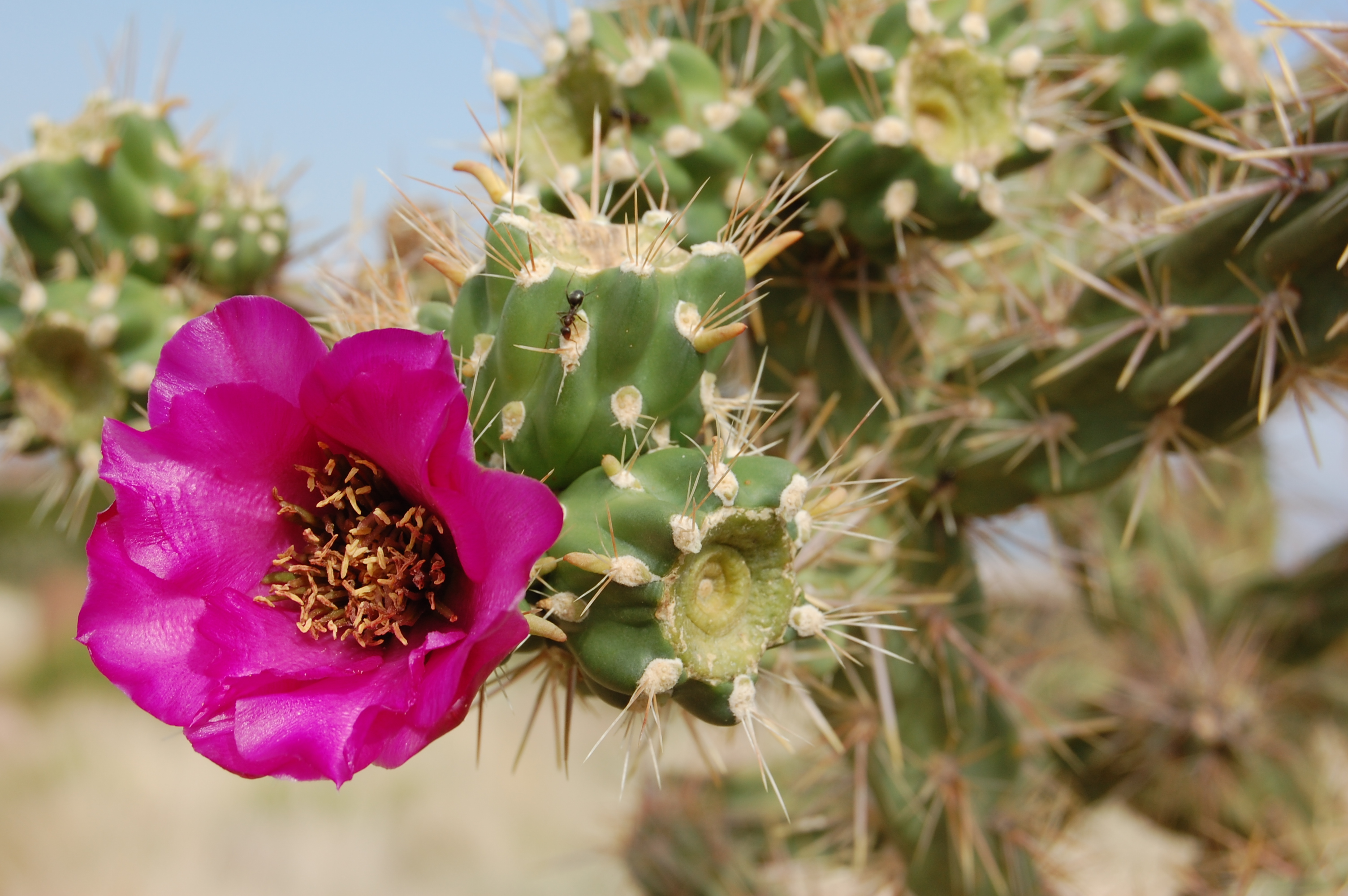
Cylindropuntia imbricata, cane cholla

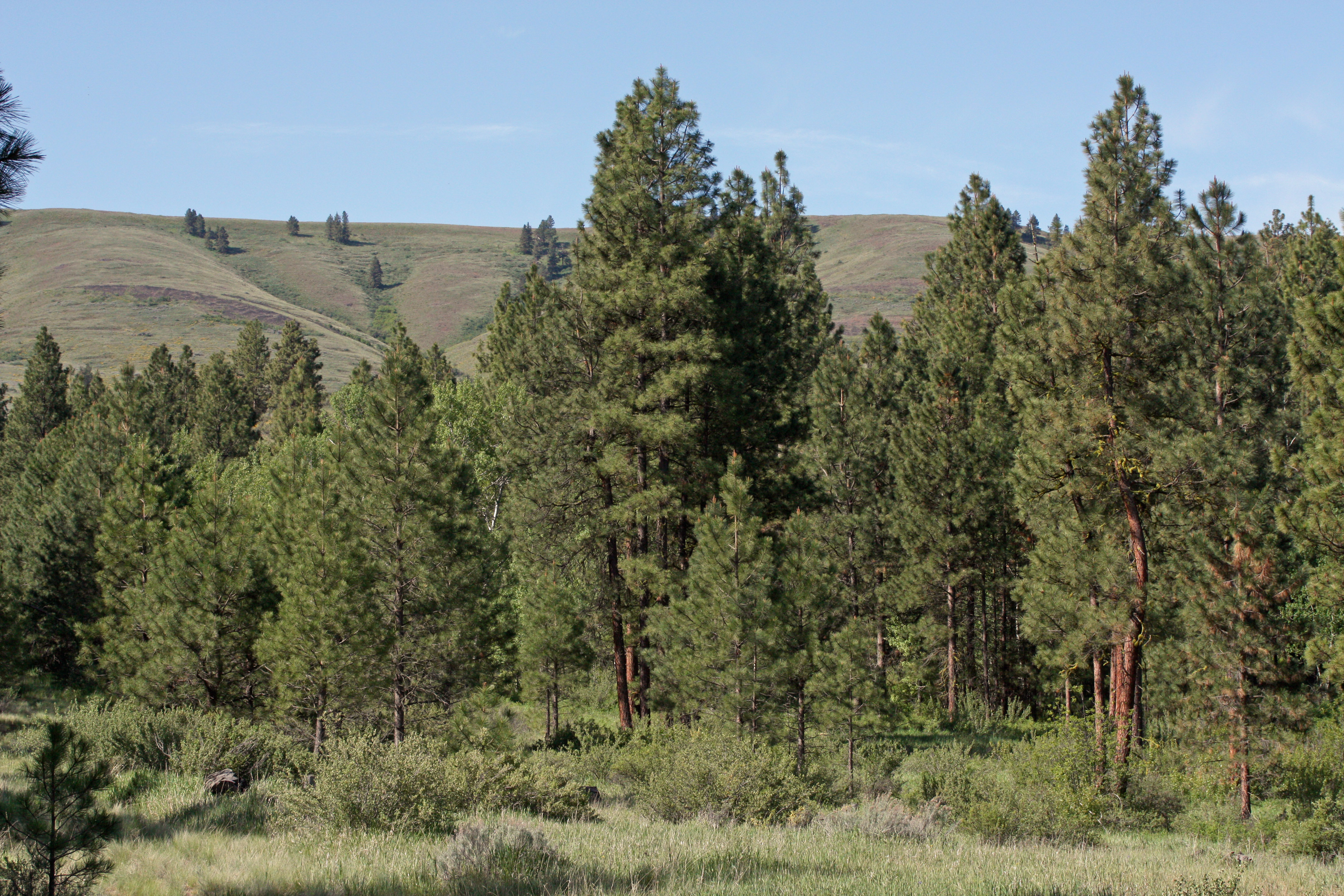
Pinus ponderosa, ponderosa pine

== Education ==
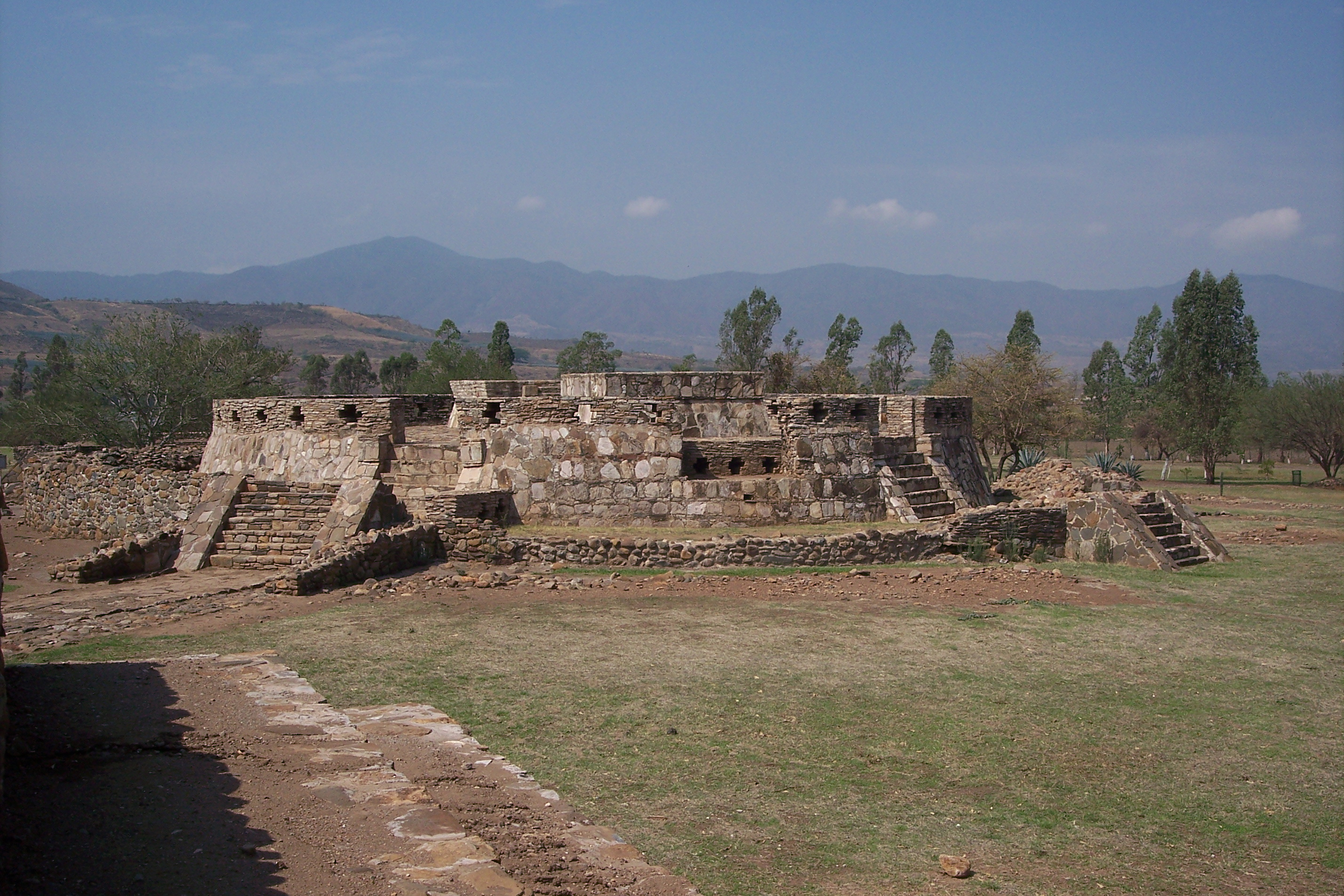
Archeological zone of Los Toriles

- Instituto Tecnológico de Tepic
- Universidad Autónoma de Nayarit
- Universidad Tecnólogica de Nayarit
- Universidad Tecnólogica de la Costa
- Escuela Normal Superior de Nayarit: a normal school (for teachers)
- Universidad Vizcaya de Las Americas
- Escuela Secundaria Técnica No. 51 (Emilio M. Gonzalez)

== Demographics ==
=== Largest cities ===
Largest cities or towns in Nayarit Source:
Rank		Municipality	Pop.
1	Tepic	Tepic	371,387
2	Xalisco	Xalisco	48,170
3	San Vicente	Bahía de Banderas	38,666
4	San José del Valle	Bahía de Banderas	35,486
5	Ixtlán del Río	Ixtlán del Río	24,477
6	Mezcales	Bahía de Banderas	24,309
7	Tuxpan	Tuxpan	22,013
8	Compostela	Compostela	20,322
9	Acaponeta	Acaponeta	19,976
10	Santiago Ixcuintla	Santiago Ixcuintla	18,023

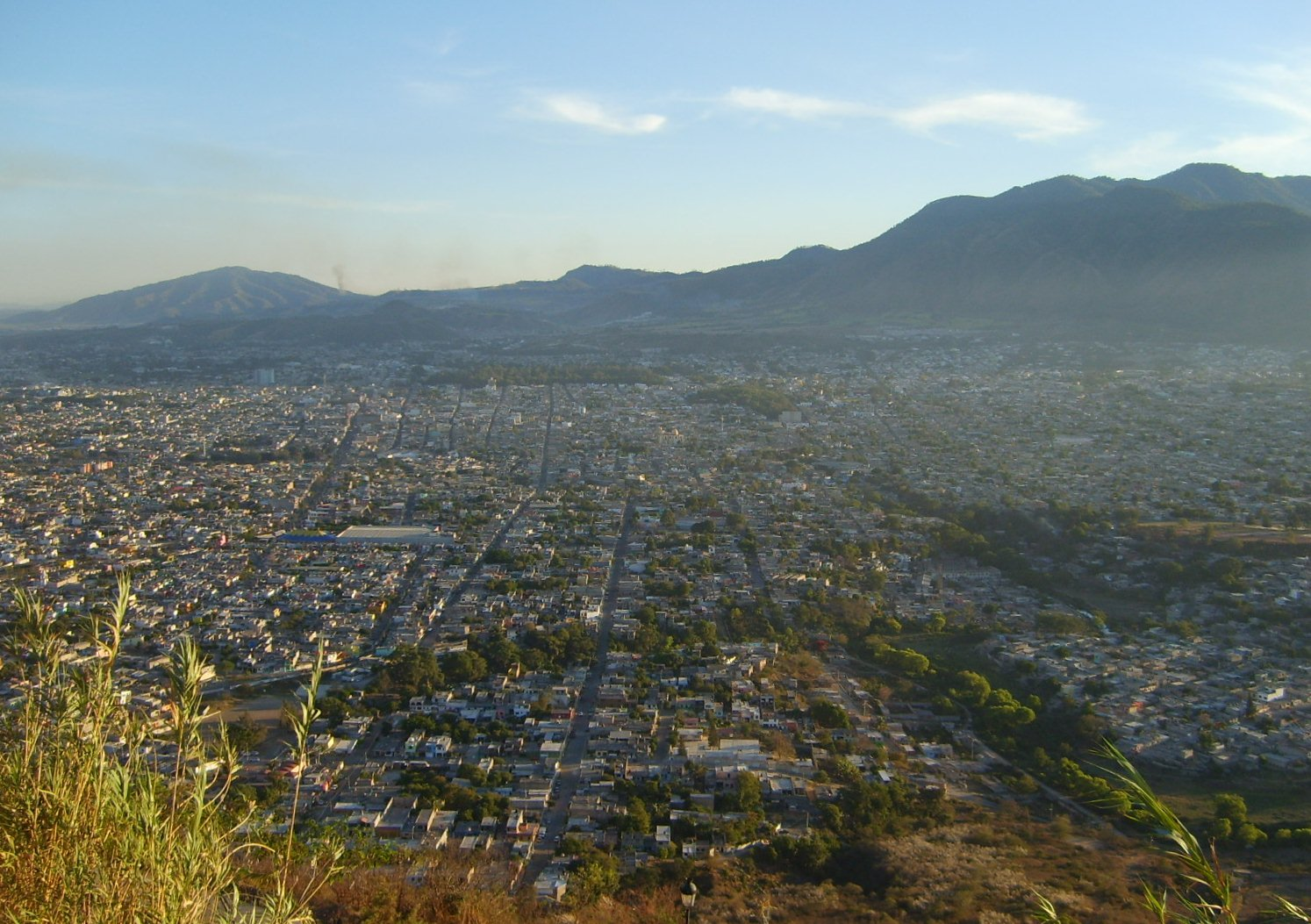
The state capital, Tepic, seen from the Cerro de la Cruz. Tepic is home to some 340,000 people.

Historical population
Year	Pop.	±%
1895	149,807	—
1900	150,098	+0.2%
1910	171,173	+14.0%
1921	163,183	−4.7%
1930	167,724	+2.8%
1940	216,698	+29.2%
1950	290,124	+33.9%
1960	389,929	+34.4%
1970	544,031	+39.5%
1980	726,120	+33.5%
1990	824,643	+13.6%
1995	896,702	+8.7%
2000	920,185	+2.6%
2005	949,684	+3.2%
2010	1,084,979	+14.2%
2015	1,181,050	+8.9%
2020	1,235,456	+4.6%

Nayarit is Mexico's twenty-ninth most populous state. According to the census of 2020, the state had a population of 1,235,456 and its population density was 39/km^{2}.

=== Indigenous groups ===
Nayarit is the home to four indigenous groups: the Wixaritari (Huichol), the Naayeri (Cora), the Odam (Tepehuan) and the Nahuatl-speaking Mexicaneros. The indigenous groups mostly inhabit the Nayar highlands, but are also frequently encountered in Tepic and on the Pacific coast, where they have also established colonies. They are known for their crafts and artwork which they sell. About five percent of the state population speaks an indigenous language.

== Economy ==
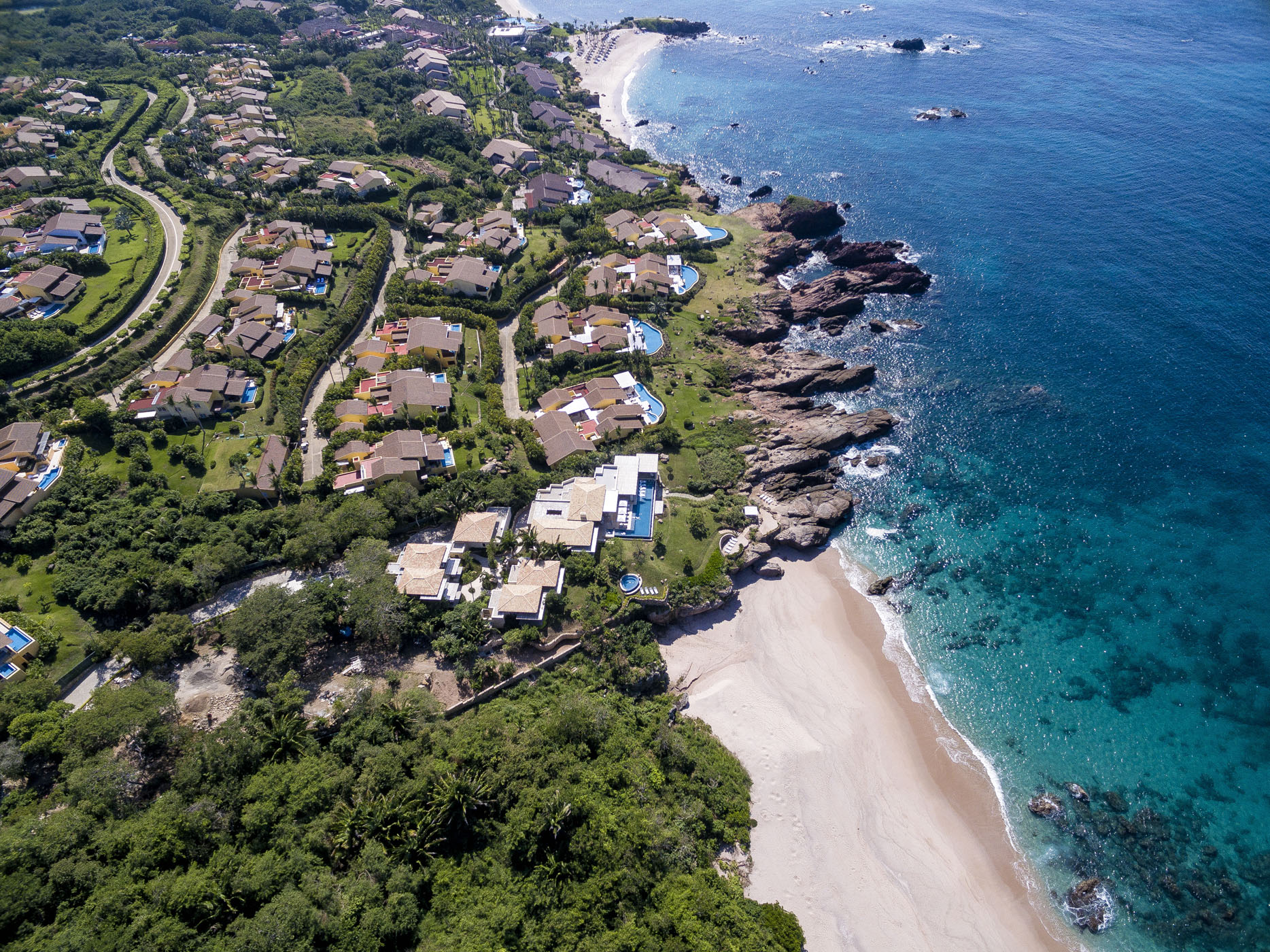
Punta Mita is a major tourist destination on the Riviera Nayarit

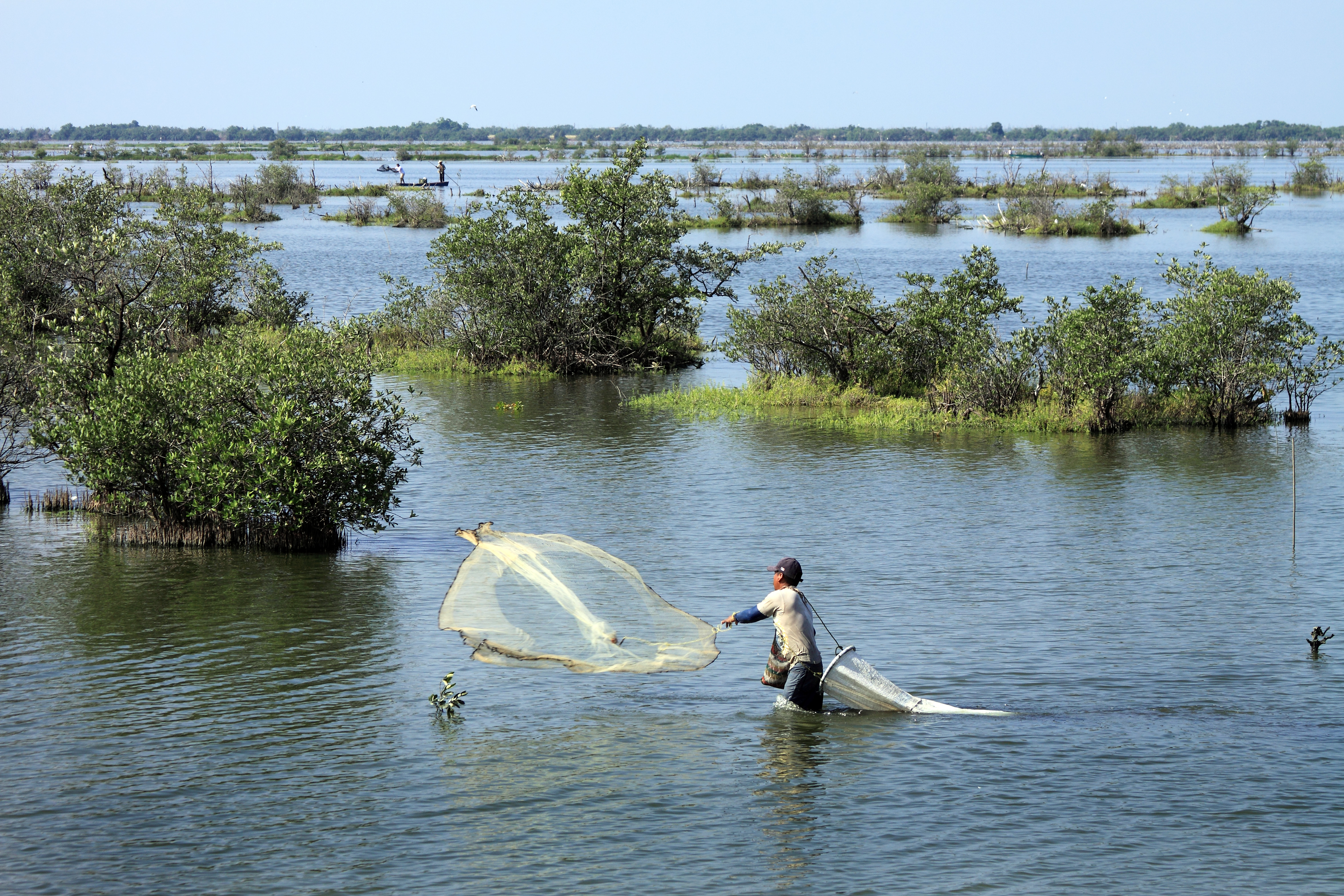
Shrimp fisherman on the coast of Nayarit

Nayarit is predominantly an agricultural state, and produces a large variety of crops such as beans, sorghum, sugar cane, maize, tobacco, rice, chiles, peanuts, melons, tomatoes, coffee, mangoes, bananas, and avocados. In addition to these crops, livestock and fishing are also central to the local economy. Approximately six percent of the land in Nayarit is pasture land, with the most common livestock being cattle, horses, pigs, goats, and sheep. Nayarit has 289 kilometers of coastline, which provides an abundance of fish and shellfish, including bass, snapper, sharks, and oysters. There are over 75 cooperatives related to the fishing industry alone in Nayarit. Much of the food produced in Nayarit is exported to the larger urban areas surrounding Mexico City and Guadalajara, and much of the agricultural labor is performed by migrant laborers. Although mining exists in Nayarit, it is mostly of non-metallic substances such as limestone or kaolin.

Beginning in the late 90's, Nayarit has become known as a producer of specialty Arabica coffee, regarded for its fine taste and high density beans grown in the volcanic soils of the Sierra Madre Occidental. Nayarit coffee is exported all over the world, including to the UK and Australia via the Grupo Terruño Nayarita farmers cooperative.

In recent years, Nayarit has worked to build its tourism sector, marketing the "Riviera Nayarit" as a safe, beautiful destination served by Puerto Vallarta International Airport. Popular resort towns include Bucerías, Punta de Mita, La Cruz de Huanacaxtle, San Blas, Santiago Ixcuintla, Sayulita and Tecuala. However, some residents in these and other towns are concerned that the growth in the tourism industry might have harmful impacts on the community. Timeshare scams with links to the local Nayarit Mafia are quite common.

== Media ==
Newspapers of Nayarit include: El Periódico en que Nayarit Opina Día a Día, El Semanario que refleja qué hay en Nayarit, Matutino Gráfico, Meridiano de Nayarit, and Realidades.

== See also ==
- Ixtlán del Rio (archaeological site)
- Western Mexico shaft tomb tradition
