= Amatlán de Cañas =

- City and municipality
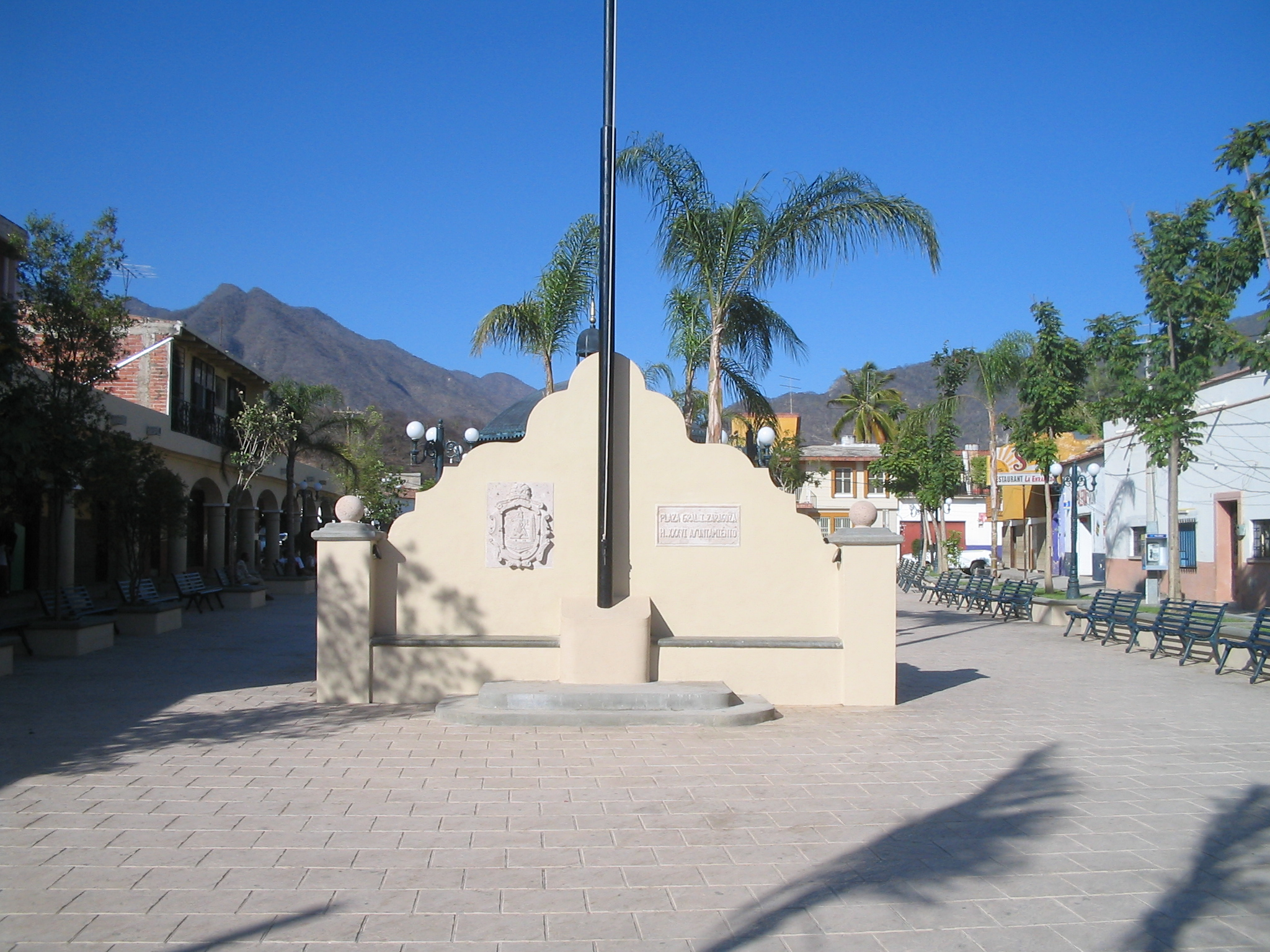
- Plaza principal de Amatlán

- Location in Nayarit Amatlán de Cañas (Mexico)
- Coordinates: 20.8°N 104.4°W
- Country: Mexico
- State: Nayarit

Government
  - Federal electoral district: Nayarit's 3rd

Population (2020)
  - Total: 11,536
  - Seat: 3,267
- Time zone: UTC-7 (Zona Pacífico)

Amatlán de Cañas is a municipality and municipal seat in the southwest of the Mexican state of Nayarit, being the southernmost municipality in Nayarit. The population in 2005 was 10,392 (12,088 in 2000) in a total area of 765 km^{2} (295 sq mi), which made up 2.77% of the surface of the state. The municipal seat had a population of 3,275 in 2005.

It is bordered on the north by the municipalities of Ahuacatlán and Ixtlán del Río; on the east, west, and south by the state of Jalisco. (Map.)

== Etymology ==
The Nahuatl word Amatlán, "place where there is an abundance of amate and paper", is composed of the words "Amtl", tree known as "Ámate and Paper" and "Tlán", place where there is an abundance of. When the municipality was created the word cañas was incorporated because of the presence of sugar mills (trapiches) in the region.

== History ==
In 2023, Amatlán was designated a Pueblo Mágico by the Mexican government, recognizing its cultural and historical importance.

== Geography ==
Amatlán is mainly mountainous, with 85% of its surface in mountains and 15% in semi-flat areas. There are several peaks with Cerro Alto the highest at 2,080 meters. The municipal seat itself is located at an elevation of 740 meters.

The main rivers are the Río Ameca, which forms the boundary between the states of Nayarit and Jalisco and the Río Amatlán, which rises in the Pajaritos mountains, southeast of Ixtlán del Río.

== Demographics ==
In 1995 the 12,601 inhabitants made up 1.4% of the total state population; seventeenth place in the state. The population density was 16.5 inhabitants per km^{2}, being one of the least populated in the state. From 1990 to 1995, the total population decreased 4.3%, caused by migratory phenomena towards the United States and the state of Jalisco.

== Economy ==
Most of the population is engaged in agriculture, cattle raising and services. The main agricultural products are maize, beans, peanuts, potatoes, and sorghum. There is also some fruit cultivation: bananas, papaya, plums, avocado and citrus fruits.

The cattle herd is small due to the steep elevations.

Industry is small and is mainly manufacturing. There is a rice-separation mill, maize grinding mills, small shops and bakeries, as well as small factories of tiles, ice, soap and toasted peanuts.

== Tourism ==
The main tourist attractions are the hot springs in Amatlan (Agua Caliente and Aguas Termales swimming pools), El Manto, the villages of Barranca del Oro, El Rosario, and the "mirador" where you can see the view of the whole town; the plazas around the close small towns, Penas juntas, and there's a river and two big rocks between it where you can climb.

There are also new soccer and basketball fields in "La mesita" and the malecon around the river, allowing visitors to ride motorcycles, camp by the river, or explore the town and church of Jesus Nazareno.

== See also ==
- Municipalities of Nayarit
