= La Yesca =

Coordinates: 21°19′N 104°00′W

- Municipality
- Location in Mexico La Yesca (Mexico)
- Country: Mexico
- State: Nayarit

Government
  - Federal electoral district: Nayarit's 3rd
- Demonym: (in Spanish)
- Time zone: UTC−7 (Zona Pacífico)

La Yesca (Spanish pronunciation: [la ˈɟʝeska]) is a municipality and the municipal seat of the same in the Mexican state of Nayarit. It is Nayarit's easternmost and least densely populated municipality. The population of the municipality was 12,025 (2005). The population of the town and municipal seat was 356 inhabitants in 2005. The population density was 7 inhabitants per square kilometer, one of the lowest in the state.

== Geography ==
La Yesca municipality covers 4,316.311 square kilometres (1,666.537 sq mi), having the second largest area for municipalities in Nayarit. Located at the southern end of the Sierra Madre Occidental, it is mostly mountainous terrain. It lies between 21º 10’ and 22º 00’ North latitude and 103º 43” and 104º 33’ west longitude. It is bordered to the southwest by the municipalities of Santa María del Oro, Jala and Ixtlán del Río, to the northwest by the municipality of El Nayar, and to the north, east and south by the state of Jalisco.

Mountainous zones comprise 95% of the area. The main elevations are Sierra el Pinabete at 1,420 m, the Sierra Pajaritos with an elevation of 2,500 m and the Sierra de Álica with an elevation of 2,200 m.

The rivers are the Río Grande de Santiago, Bolaños, Camotlán, Huaynamota and Jora Viejo.

== Demographics ==
The census of 1995 registered 4,350 indigenous inhabitants, which made up 35.92% of the population. La Yesca had the second largest indigenous population in the state after El Nayar.

== Economy ==
There is at least one active mine for gold and silver located on a 6 km^{2} concession. The project includes two previous producing mines and a modern milling facility capable of milling 200 tonnes per day of feed. Approximately 200,000 tonnes of tailings are available to process immediately, with the tailings containing good grades of both gold and silver.

== Notable people ==
- Lupita Palomera (1913–2008), Mexican singer of radio, stage, film, and television. Successful performer of Mexican bolero. Known for her recordings of "Vereda tropical", "Perfidia", "Frenesí", and "Incertidumbre", among other songs.
- Ahuizotl Sánchez (b. 1962), football player and manager
