= Riviera Nayarit =

Nearly 200-mile stretch along Mexico's Pacific coast

The Riviera Nayarit (Spanish pronunciation: [ri'βjeɾa naʝa'ɾit]) is a nearly 200-mile (320 km) stretch of coastline in Mexico between the historic port of San Blas, Nayarit, to where the Ameca River empties into Banderas Bay, Nuevo Vallarta.

Riviera Nayarit was named to promote the coastline of Nayarit, and it includes such notable sites as Chacala Bay and Chacalilla.

== Composition ==
The large coastline that occupies the Riviera Nayarit is made up, among others, by the main beaches and the following destinations, that are characterized by major hotels and a vast flora and fauna along the coastline:

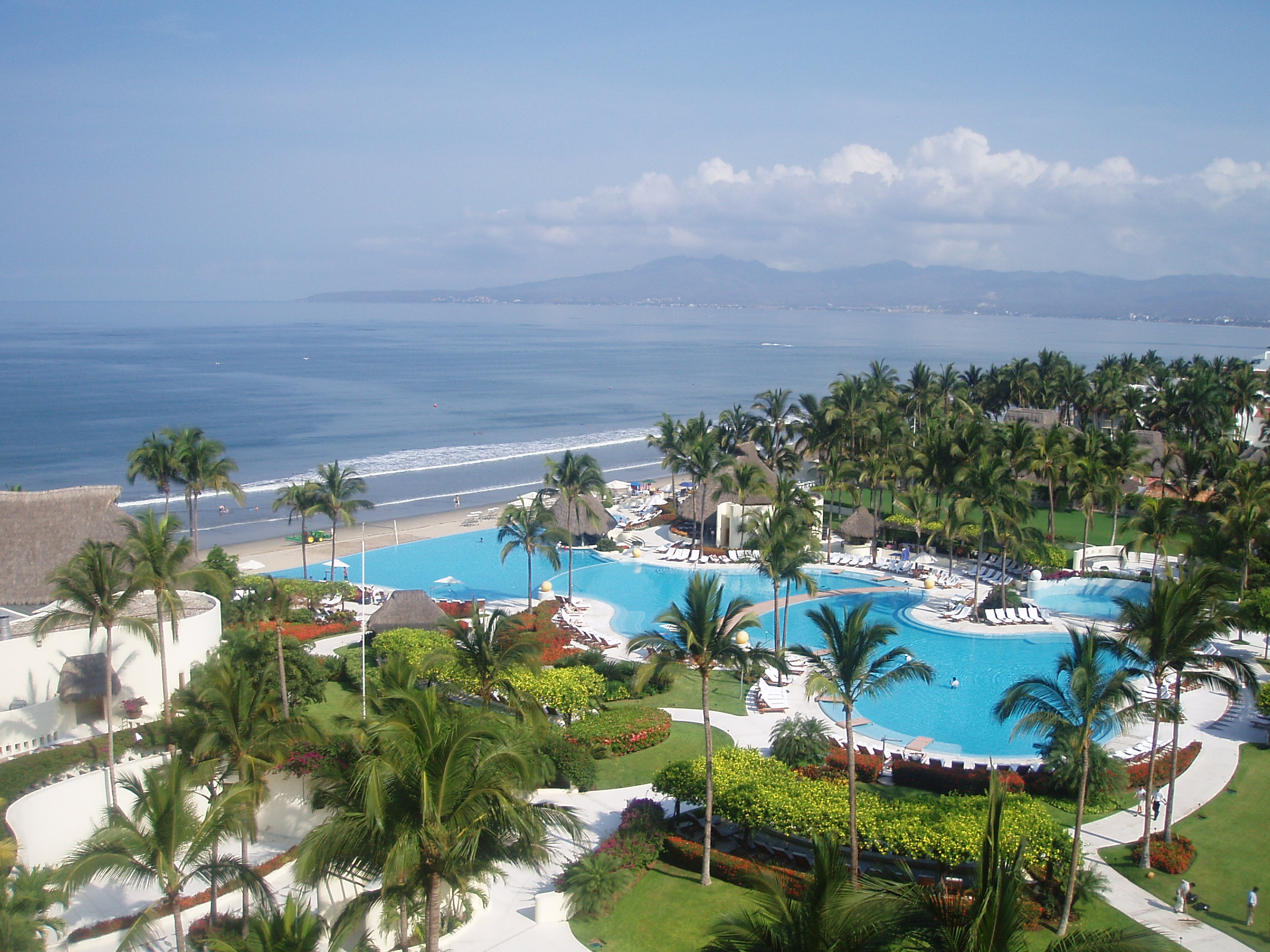
Nuevo Vallarta beach view

- Nuevo Vallarta
- San Blas
- Jarretaderas
- Flamingos
- Bucerías
- La Cruz de Huanacaxtle
- Punta de Mita
- Litibú
- Sayulita
- San Francisco
- Lo de Marcos
- Rincón de Guayabitos
- La Peñita de Jaltemba
- Los Ayala
- El Capomo
- Bahía de Chacala
- Playa Platanitos

== Archaeological sites ==
The following locations have attractive archaeological sites: Alta Vista, Aticama, Bucerías, Sayulita famous for surfing, San Francisco, Lo de Marcos, Los Ayala, Rincón de Guayabitos, Peñita de Jaltemba and Las Varas.

== See also ==
- Mexican Riviera
- Riviera Maya
