= Nuestra Belleza Nayarit 2012 =

- Date: May 24, 2012
- Presenters: Malillany Marín, Jorge Inda
- Venue: Teatro del Pueblo "Alí Chumacero", Tepic, Nayarit
- Broadcaster: Ritmoson Latino
- Entrants: 6
- Placements: 4
- Winner: Jasibi Suma; Riviera

Nuestra Belleza Nayarit 2012, was held at the Teatro del Pueblo "Alí Chumacero" of Tepic, Nayarit on May 24, 2012. At the conclusion of the final night of competition Jasibi Suma from the Riviera Nayarita was crowned the winner. Suma was crowned by outgoing Nuestra Belleza Nayarit titleholder Linda Ugarte. Six contestants competed for the title.

== Results ==
=== Placements ===
Final results	Contestant
Nuestra Belleza Nayarit 2012	Jasibi Suma
Suplente / 1st Runner-up	Perla Cortez
2nd Runner-up	Adriana Ruíz

== Contestants ==
Hometown	Contestant	Age	Height
Bahía de Banderas	Adriana Elizabeth Ruiz Hernández	20	1.72
Ixtlán del Río	Yoali Guadalupe González López	21	1.70
Riviera Nayarita	Lilia Jasibi Suma Cueva	22	1.77
Tepic	Jocelin Aydé Ávila Cervantes	21	1.70
Tepic	Patricia Carolyna Pérez Padilla	20	1.69
Tepic	Perla Guadalupe Cortez Peña	20	1.71
