= List of 2017 Women's March locations outside the United States =

Listed below are 224 marches outside the United States in support of the 2017 Women's March.

- Antarctica
- Argentina
- Australia
- Austria
- Bahamas
- Belgium
- Bermuda
- Brazil
- Bulgaria
- Canada
- Chile
- Colombia
- Costa Rica
- Croatia
- Czech Republic
- Democratic Republic of the Congo
- Denmark
- East Timor
- Ecuador
- Finland
- France
- Georgia
- Germany
- Ghana
- Greece
- Guatemala
- Hungary
- Hong Kong
- Iceland
- India
- Indonesia
- Iraq
- Ireland
- Israel
- Italy
- Japan
- Jordan
- Kenya
- Kosovo
- Latvia
- Lebanon
- Lithuania
- Macau
- Malawi
- Mexico
- Morocco
- Myanmar
- Netherlands
- New Zealand
- Nicaragua
- Nigeria
- Norway
- Peru
- Philippines
- Poland
- Portugal
- St. Kitts and Nevis
- Saudi Arabia
- Serbia
- Slovakia
- Slovenia
- South Africa
- South Korea
- Spain
- Sweden
- Switzerland
- Tanzania
- Thailand
- Uganda
- United Kingdom
- Vietnam
- Zambia
- Zimbabwe

== North America ==
More than thirty events were organized across Canada with at least twenty organized in British Columbia alone.

Hundreds of Canadians were estimated to have travelled to Washington, D.C. to attend the rally. A number of Canadians heading to the United States to attend other protests and rallies were turned away at the Canada–United States border. In at least one case, border agents went through the individual's email and Facebook before denying him entry.

Country	Prov.	Locations	Photo	Approximate attendance	Notes
The Bahamas		Freeport		20	Taino Beach, Grand Bahama
Canada	AB	Calgary		4,000	Calgary City Hall
Canada	AB	Edmonton		2,000 – 5,000	Alberta legislature
Canada	AB	Lethbridge		500–600	corner of Mayor Magrath Drive & 9 Ave South
Canada	BC	Balfour			Sunshine Bay Regional Park
Canada	BC	Bowen Island		200+	Bowen Island Library
Canada	BC	Castlegar		40–65	Pioneer Arena
Canada	BC	Courtenay			Court House Park
Canada	BC	Gabriola Island			
Canada	BC	Grand Forks		140	Archives Coffee House
Canada	BC	Kamloops		500	City Hall – Riverside Park
Canada	BC	Kelowna		500+	gathering at the Sails
Canada	BC	Kootenay Bay		70+	March hosted by the Yasodhara Ashram
Canada	BC	Nanaimo		1,000	Diana Krall Plaza – Maffeo Sutton Park
Canada	BC	Pender Island		58	Driftwood Shopping Centre
Canada	BC	Prince George		hundreds	Civic Plaza
Canada	BC	Revelstoke		60 – 70	Kovach Park – Centennial Park Worker's Memorial
Canada	BC	Roberts Creek		50	Gumboot Restaurant
Canada	BC	Salmon Arm		30	City Hall – Ross Street Plaza
Canada	BC	Salt Spring Island		500–600	Salt Spring Library – Ganges
Canada	BC	Tofino			Common Loaf Bake Shop
Canada	BC	Vancouver		15,000	Actress Vera Farmiga repped the celebrities in Vancouver's march, which ran from Jack Poole Plaza to Trump Tower on West Georgia Street.
Canada	BC	Victoria		2,000	Centennial Square
Canada	MB	Winnipeg		1,000	Centre Court at Portage Place – Portage and Main and past the U.S. Consulate in the TD building. Organizers were hoping for as many as 500 Winnipeggers to show up but were overwhelmed by the turnout which some estimated at twice that number.
Canada	NB	Fredericton		close to 500	Fredericton City Hall – New Brunswick Legislature
Canada	NB	Saint John		200	Queen Square
Canada	NB	Moncton			Moncton City Hall
Canada	NL	North West River		dozen+	group snowshoe and boil-up on the beach
Canada	NL	St. John's			City Hall; due to blizzard conditions, organizers held a "virtual" rally on social media.
Canada	NS	Halifax		1,000 – 2,500	Halifax City Hall
Canada	NS	Orangedale			march planned on Cape Breton Island
Canada	NS	Sandy Cove		15	Highway 217 (population of Sandy Cove: 65)
Canada	NS	Shelburne			
Canada	NS	Sydney			
Canada	NS	Wolfville			
Canada	NWT	Yellowknife		dozens	Protesters braved −20 °C temperatures in a march in Yellowknife
Canada	ON	Guelph		hundreds	Market Square
Canada	ON	Hamilton		1,000	Hamilton City Hall
Canada	ON	Huntsville		30+	Huntsville Place Mall
Canada	ON	Kingston		1,000	Skeleton Park (McBurney Park) – Springer Market Square
Canada	ON	London		1,400	Victoria Park. A lone Trump supporter carrying a Trump-Pence campaign sign debated with some demonstrators; while he talked with a reporter, someone snatched the sign from his hands.
Canada	ON	Ottawa		8,000	Ottawa police estimated the size of the crowd to be between 6,000 and 8,000 people. It was enough people to fill the length of Laurier Avenue West from Bronson Avenue to Metcalfe Street
Canada	ON	Port Dover		80	event held at Powell Park
Canada	ON	St. Catharines		200+	St. Catharines City Hall – MP Chris Bittle's office
Canada	ON	Stratford		200–250	Stratford City Hall – Knox Presbyterian
Canada	ON	Timmins		20	A group of 20 women and men marched to Timmins City Hall; event organized by Timmins and Area Women in Crisis (TAWC)
Canada	ON	Toronto		60,000	Tens of thousands of people showed up at Queen's Park, marched down University Avenue and ended up outside of City Hall at Nathan Phillips Square. Status of Women minister Maryam Monsef missed the march because she was attending meetings in her riding and preparing for the Liberal cabinet retreat.
Canada	PE	Charlottetown		200	People gathered outside Province House
Canada	QC	Montreal		8,000–10,000	Esplanade de la Place des Arts
Canada	QC	Sutton		100	The Principale
Canada	SK	Saskatoon		800 – 1,000	Saskatoon City Hall
Canada	YT	Whitehorse		200	Several hundred people braved −35 °C temperatures for their march in solidarity with marches happening around the world.
Costa Rica		Cahuita			gym at Playa Negra
Costa Rica		Monteverde		250	
Costa Rica		Nosara		100	Playa Guiones
Costa Rica		Playa Potrero		50	Costa Rican Sailing Center
Costa Rica		San José		hundreds	Post Office – Parque Central – Plaza de la Cultura
Guatemala		Antigua		~100	Calle del Arco. People chanted, "Bridges, not walls!"
Mexico		Ajijic		500+	Ajijic Cultural Center – Colón de Ajijic Street
Mexico		Álamos		100	
Mexico		El Sargento		50	rally organized by a group of US residents in Baja California Sur
Mexico		La Manzanilla		400	The Jardin
Mexico		Mazatlán		30–100	Escudo in Olas Altas, near the Hotel Posada Freeman – Cliffdiver's Plaza (El Clavadista)
Mexico		Mérida		500	Hennessy's Irish Pub
Mexico		Mexico City		hundreds	The march in Mexico City was so large that the crowd of people, both Mexican and American, stretched all along the route from the US Embassy to the Angel of Independence. Demonstrators protested against both President Trump and Mexican President Enrique Peña Nieto (whose domestic approval rating stood even lower at 12%), and called for gender equality and women's rights.
Mexico		Oaxaca City		2,000	Santo Domingo Church – Metropolitan Cathedral
Mexico		Playa del Carmen		95	Portal Maya – Ah Cacao on Calle 40th
Mexico		San Miguel de Allende		2,000	Parque Juarez
Mexico		San Pancho		1,000	soccer field on Tercer Mundo – Plaza del Sol
Mexico		Todos Santos			event planned at Town Plaza
Mexico		Zihuatanejo		40	walk down LaRopa Beach from Patty's to Rosie's
Nicaragua		Managua		50	U.S. embassy
Saint Kitts and Nevis		Charlestown			march planned: Café des Arts – Court House square (via Main St)

== South America ==
Country	Locations	Photo	Approximate attendance	Notes
Argentina	Buenos Aires		100	People gathered in front of the US embassy in Argentina. The protest was spontaneously organized by an American woman living in Buenos Aires, and joined by many American and Argentinean women and men. Other local political movements also joined, like Las Piqueteras.
Brazil	Brasília		26–30	Dozens of people held hands in a circle outside Museu Nacional da República.
Brazil	Rio de Janeiro		150	Demonstrators marched along the beach (Praça Nossa Senhora da Paz – Ipanema) during Rio's Women's March.
Chile	Santiago		50	US Embassy
Colombia	Bogotá		150	square near the Parque El Virrey in Bogotá's Chico neighborhood
Ecuador	Cuenca		70	Parque Calderón – San Sebastián plaza
Ecuador	Quito			
Peru	Chiclayo			event planned in Jose Leonardo Ortiz District
Peru	Lima		30–40	

== Europe ==
Country	Locations	Photo	Approximate attendance	Notes
Austria	Vienna		2,000	In Vienna, people met in front of the Karlskirche in the first district. The march went through the first district and ended in the Stadtpark. With sub-zero temperatures around −7 °C (~20 °F), only one or two hundred people were expected to show up to support the movement, so it was a great shock when the actual turnout reached as high as two thousand before quickly thinning down to several hundred. Many students from various schools in Vienna, ranging from local to international, made an appearance. There were many signs calling for gender equality, human rights, and LGBTQ+ rights. Some people even took this opportunity to call upon the government to deal with the Syrian refugee crisis, which was currently a problem for Austria and other European countries.
Belgium	Brussels		2,000	On Friday evening, January 20, people gathered at the "Muntplein" in central Brussels for a candlelight protest of Trump's inauguration.
Bermuda	Hamilton		120+	Par-la-Ville Park / Queen Elizabeth Park
Bulgaria	Sofia			Protesters gathered in front of the Sofia University.
Croatia	Zagreb		hundreds	Protesters led by the representatives from the Citizens' Initiative "United Against Hate" gathered at Cvjetni Square and the Square of Petar Preradović at 11:55 am (In the Balkans, expression "five to noon" symbolizes the very last moment to take action). The organizers' slogan was "Our fight lasts throughout the year."
Czech Republic	Prague		700	People gathered in Wenceslas Square in freezing weather, mockingly waving portraits of Trump and Russian president Vladimir Putin, as well banners that read "Love Trumps Hate".
Denmark	Copenhagen		5,000	Protesters marched from the US-embassy to the parliament.
Finland	Helsinki		hundreds	People gathered in Kamppi Square in solidarity to defend women's rights and the environment. They emphasized that these issues concern all people, not only Americans or women. The organizers' slogan was "When there's nothing you can do, you can not just do nothing." The rally included members of parliament Ozan Yanar, Ville Niinistö, Eva Biaudet, and Paavo Arhinmäki.
France	Auvillar		35+	Place de la Halle
France	Bordeaux		300	Place de la Comédie – American Consulate
France	Lyon		hundreds	
France	Marseille		200	Vieux Port at the Ombriere
France	Montpellier		1,500	Place du Peyrou – Place de la Comédie
France	Nice		45+	5 Place Masséna
France	Paris		7,000+	In Paris, 7,000 people, according to police, gathered at Trocadero Square to tell their rejection of Donald Trump and defend women's rights. Most slogans were written in English. At 4 pm, the protesters arrived at their destination in front of the Peace Wall.
France	Poitiers		50–75	Place du Marché
France	Strasbourg		500	Place Kléber
France	Toulouse		700	Following the march, a candlelight vigil was held at Esplanade François Mitterrand (between Place Wilson and the entrance to Metro Jean Jaurés).
Germany	Berlin		500–650	Hundreds of people gathered in front of the US embassy at the Brandenburg Gate on Saturday. On posters were slogans like "Trump is not a Berliner".
Germany	Bonn		100 – 200	Kaiserplatz – main train station – Marktplatz
Germany	Düsseldorf		100	Bertha-von-Suttner-Platz
Germany	Frankfurt		2,100	The largest of Germany's rallies took place in Frankfurt, with over 2,000 protesters marching through the city center.
Germany	Hamburg		700	Destination given as "Bad Homburg auf der Höhe" on the womensmarch.com/sisters website, but actually at the U.S. Consolate General
Germany	Heidelberg		800 – 1,000	Friedrich-Ebert-Platz – Heidelberg City Hall. Apart from the hundreds of demonstrators (mostly women), police counted only four Trump fans.
Germany	Munich		600 – 1,000	Hundreds of people marched from the US Consulate General to the city center.
Greece	Athens		100–1,000+	Protesters marched in the streets of Athens for human rights, women's rights, and refugee rights. Large numbers of refugees and children joined the protests. Signs had Anti-fascism and pro-immigrant slogans and chants echoed those around the world in condemning far right agendas and the need for the equality of women. Crowds gathered first at Syntagma Square then marched to the U.S. Embassy in Athens.
Hungary	Budapest		400 – 500	Freedom Square, in front of US Embassy – Danube embankment – Chain Bridge
Iceland	Reykjavík		200	Arnarhóll – Austurvellir
Ireland	Galway		250–300	A crowd of around 250 to 300 people gathered in Eyre Square in Galway in the afternoon. Attendees heard calls for a united front to counter the impact of the new US administration.
Ireland	Castlebar		120	"Bridges not Walls" rally in Market Square
Ireland	Dublin		5,000	Thousands gathered to march down O'Connell Street. Though the march was originally planned to conclude with a rally at the General Post Office, crowds became so large it had to be moved to Parnell Square. The march was organized by the Abortion Rights Campaign, Amnesty International Ireland, European Network Against Racism, ROSA, and The Coalition to Repeal the 8th, and supported by groups such as the National Women's Council of Ireland and the Union of Students in Ireland.
Italy	Florence		150+	the American Consulate
Italy	Milan		250	La Scala opera house
Italy	Rome		hundreds	Protesters gathered outside the Pantheon in Rome. Their messages included "Women's rights are human rights" and "Yes we must".
Kosovo	Pristina		hundreds	In Pristina, capital of the largely Muslim former Yugoslav republic of Kosovo, a few hundred protestors, mostly women, joined a protest against the new Trump administration.
Latvia	Riga		200	Approximately 200 people gathered to march from the Poļu Gate through the Old Town, ending at the Freedom Monument.
Lithuania	Vilnius		120	Vincas Kudirka Square
Netherlands	Amsterdam		3,000	Museumplein – US Consolate
Netherlands	The Hague		1,000	Protestors walked from Maliveld to the US Embassy.
Netherlands	Roermond			
Norway	Bergen		500–1,000	Several hundred people gathered at Festplassen in Bergen.
Norway	Oslo		2,000 – 3,000	Hundreds gathered for speeches at Youngstorget in central Oslo.
Norway	Stavanger			
Norway	Trondheim		280	Trondheim Square
Poland	Gdańsk		40	Długi Targ (Long Market), near Neptune
Poland	Kraków		100	Participants gathered in front of the US Consulate.
Poland	Warsaw		200	office of the Prime Minister – U.S. Embassy in Warsaw
Portugal	Angra do Heroísmo			
Portugal	Braga			event planned at Praça da República
Portugal	Coimbra		100+	Praça 8 de Maio
Portugal	Faro			
Portugal	Lisbon		500+	Marched next to the embassy of the United States of America.
Portugal	Porto		hundreds	Praça dos Poveiros
Serbia	Belgrade		~50	
Slovakia	Piešťany			
Slovenia	Ljubljana			In Ljubljana, Slovenia, home country of first lady Melania Trump, organizers said they could not get permission from the city in time for a march and instead encouraged supporters to "get together with friends on this day and to walk."
Spain	Barcelona		700	Plaça Urquinaona – Plaça Sant Jaume
Spain	Granada		dozens	Fuente de las Batallas
Spain	Madrid		550 (total)	(Jan 20) In Madrid, on the day of Trump's inauguration, a group called Madrid Resistance (500 people) marched from Plaza de Isabel II to Puerta del Sol. (Jan. 21) About 50 protesters gathered at the US Embassy in Madrid to show international solidarity against Trump's "homophobic, xenophobic, and racist" policies.
Sweden	Stockholm		4,000	Norrmalmstorg Square – US Embassy
Sweden	Åre		50–60	A protest on cross-country skis took place.
Switzerland	Geneva		2,500 – 3,000	Pont du Mont-Blanc bridge – along the Lake Geneva shoreline.
Switzerland	Zürich		10,000+	(Mar. 18) Because Zurich was not granted a march permit on the same day as Geneva and other cities, thousands of people had to wait until March (International Women's Day) to take to the streets, with “the same commitment” as the global movement.
United Kingdom	Barnstaple		200+	Museum of Barnstaple and North Devon – High Street
United Kingdom	Bristol		1,000+	More than 1,000 marched from Queen Square to College Green
United Kingdom	Lancaster		500	A rally was held at Dalton Square, under the statue of Victoria.
United Kingdom	Leeds		hundreds	Leeds city centre
United Kingdom	Liverpool		1,000+	St. George's Hall
United Kingdom	London		100,000	Protesters marched 2 miles (3.2 km) in London from Grosvenor Square in Mayfair, past the US embassy and onto Trafalgar Square. London Mayor Sadiq Khan was present. Speakers included Sandi Toksvig and Yvette Cooper. Issues included women's, workers', and LGBT rights, as well as Brexit. Celebrity participants included Ian McKellen, Gillian Anderson, John C. Reilly, Lin-Manuel Miranda, Sharon Horgan, Josh Gad, Rebecca Hall, Thandie Newton and Riz Ahmed.
United Kingdom	Manchester		2,000	Albert Square
United Kingdom	Shipley		1,500	Shipley Market Square
United Kingdom	Southampton		hundreds	Bargate Monument
United Kingdom	St Austell		100	Portholland
United Kingdom	York		hundreds	The Cathedral and Metropolitical Church of Saint Peter, aka York Minster
United Kingdom	Belfast		1000-1200	Belfast City Hall; hundreds came
United Kingdom	Aberdeen			(Jan 20) On the same day that Donald Trump was sworn in as the 45th US president, protests were held across Scotland.
United Kingdom	Edinburgh		2,200+	Edinburgh's US Consulate saw two women's marches in January 2017. The first one, held on Friday the 20th, saw hundreds march in from the North Bridge to Regent Terrace. The second one on Saturday the 21st, organized through social media by Leah Higgins and Calum Stewart, both 16, attracted at least 2,000 people.
United Kingdom	Glasgow		60+	(Jan 20) A crowd of protesters gathered at the top of Buchanan Street in Glasgow.
United Kingdom	Cardiff		1,000	Singer, actress & activist Charlotte Church, who had previously declined an invite to perform at Trump's inauguration, joined the Cardiff's Women's March.

== Africa ==
Country	Locations	Photo	Approximate attendance	Notes
Democratic Republic of the Congo	Kinshasa			event planned at Steven's Place
Ghana	Accra		22+	Protesters in front of the US embassy in Accra held a banner saying, "United in Diversity"
Kenya	Nairobi		700	In Karura Forest, hundreds of rally participants met at Amani Gardens, across from the River Cafe, and marched a 2-kilometer route before gathering to picnic, celebrate, and hear speeches and performances.
Malawi	Lilongwe		40+	
Morocco	Rabat		23	Mohammed VI Museum of Modern and Contemporary Art
Nigeria	Jos			Protesters gathered in Jos, Plateau State and marched to the state's House of Assembly to demand the passage of a gender equality bill that has been stalled.
South Africa	Cape Town		500	Women gathered at Company's Garden for a solidarity march with the Washington protesters. In addition to questioning Trump's leadership, one of the messages was "Climate change is a women's issue".
South Africa	Durban			Durban CBD – U.S. Consulate
Tanzania	Dar es Salaam		220	The march occurred on Msasani Road and promoted Women's Health and Safety in Tanzania. (Note: "Includes interview of Delaware resident that participated in Dar Es Salaam march",)
Uganda	Kampala			event planned at Yasigi Beer Garden
Zambia	Lusaka		140	Kabulonga roundabout – Gymkhana
Zimbabwe	Harare		40–80	Zimbabwe women in the upmarket Borrowdale suburb of Harare were seen marching in demonstration against the presidential inauguration of Donald Trump. This irked the Progressive Democrats of Zimbabwe party leader Barbara Nyagomo, who noted that in the protests against President Robert Mugabe's brutal regime, such women would not show up.

== Asia ==
Country	Locations	Photo	Approximate attendance	Notes
East Timor	Dili			march planned: Caz Bar – Christo Rei parking area
Georgia	Tbilisi		300	Tbilisi Concert Hall – Old Parliament Building, Rustaveli Avenue
Hong Kong	Hong Kong		20+	Individual groups banded together in unofficial mini movements across Hong Kong.
India	Agra			near the Taj Mahal
India	Ahmedabad		153	Central Mall, Ambawadi
India	Bangalore		300 – 500	Thousands marched across India with rallies in 30 cities in solidarity against rape, as well as following the Women's March itself. The movement began following the response by Samajwadi Party leader Abu Azmi to the mass molestation incident in Bangalore on New Years 2017. Azmi said that "women should not go out after sunset." The protests and marches thus used the hashtag #IWillGoOut. Bangalore's march began at City Railway Station and ended at Freedom Park.
India	Bhopal		dozens	Bittan Market
India	Chandigarh		92	Panjab University Campus, Sector 14
India	Chennai		43	
India	Coimbatore			CCD Race Course
India	Dwarka (Delhi)		100	Sector 7, Maxfort School
India	Gurgaon		27	Galleria Market – Leisure Valley
India	Hyderabad		400	Jalvihar Necklace Road – People's Plaza
India	Jaipur		40	Statue Circle
India	Jammu			Jammu University
India	Karimganj			
India	Kolkata		dozens	Allen Park, Park Street
India	Lucknow		231	1090 Crossing, Gomtinagar
India	Mumbai		60+	Veer Kotwal Udyan, Dadar West, opposite Plaza Cinema
India	Nagpur		15	
India	New Delhi		hundreds	Mandi House – Jantar Mantar
India	Puducherry		119	Baskin Robbins SV Pattel Salai Road – Dupleix Statue
India	Pune		60+	Rani Laxmibai Park – Hotel Aurora Towers / MG Road
India	Ranchi		3	
India	Saligao (Goa)		56	Goa Chapter; Saligao main road
India	Silchar		168	Taruni Road Point – Khudiram Statue
India	Thiruvananthapuram		11	Trivandrum chapter; Palayam Market
India	Thrissur		30+	Kerala Sahitya Akademi
Indonesia	Jakarta		700+	(March 4) Hundreds of people gathered near the National Monument, sending a plea for maintaining gender equality, ending street harassment and LGBT discrimination, etc. March was organized individually.
Indonesia	Yogyakarta		hundreds	Women gathered in the city of Yogyakarta to promote peace and women's rights.
Iraq	Erbil		hundreds	A group of demonstrators in Iraqi Kurdistan, both locals and expats, met at the Erbil Main Square Citadel on Saturday night to show their support for women's rights.
Israel	Tel Aviv		400–500	Protestors gathered outside the U.S. Embassy. The local time accommodated the local Sabbath observance as well as the time zone difference. The majority in attendance were American Israelis, along with immigrants from other Anglophone countries and native Israelis. Chanting in Hebrew and English and holding signs, the protests aimed at Trump also included opposition to Israeli Prime Minister Benjamin Netanyahu and his government's policies, particularly the occupation of the Palestinian territories.
Japan	Osaka		84	(Friday, Jan. 20) Kansai Women's (Night) March and Inauguration Peace Vigil was held in Nakanoshima Park.
Japan	Tokyo		650	(Friday, Jan. 20) Protestors, mostly expatriates and women, marched in Tokyo's Hibiya Park, far exceeding the 150 who registered. The event was organized by Erica Summers, a Los Angeles resident who was traveling abroad at the time of the March of Washington, with assistance from Democrats Abroad.
Jordan	Amman		30+	Women held workshops in the city of Amman to promote women's rights and tolerance.
Lebanon	Beirut		30+	A women-led event consisting of dialogue and action workshops was held in Lebanon in lieu of a public rally.
Macau	Macau		100	The protesters started their march from the Taipa Houses-Museum, walked along Estrada Governador Nobre de Carvalho, and arrived outside the Venetian in Cotai.
Myanmar	Yangon		dozens	Because political circumstances would not permit a march, dozens of people instead attended a "solidarity picnic".
Philippines	Manila		500+	Marched in front of the US Embassy in Manila. Protest was led by leftist feminist group GABRIELA Women's Party. Aside from women's rights issues, the march also protested American imperialist and neoliberal policies.
Saudi Arabia	Riyadh		800+	More than 800 women planned to gather at the Riyadh Marriott Hotel on Saturday morning; however, the official Saudi Arabia march got off to a rough start when its website was hacked.
South Korea	Seoul		1,000	Protesters gathered and marched near Gangnam Station (in the snow).
Thailand	Bangkok		90	Roadhouse BBQ
Thailand	Chiang Mai		35	Activists held a picnic in a park.
Vietnam	Ho Chi Minh City			The Dublin Gate Irish Pub Saigon

== Oceania ==
Country	Locations	Photo	Approximate attendance	Notes
Australia	Brisbane		400+	King George Square
Australia	Canberra		1,000	Participants gathered in Garema Place.
Australia	Melbourne		5,000 – 7,000	People marched in from the State Library of Victoria to Parliament House.
Australia	Sydney		8,000–10,000	Protesters gathered in Hyde Park, then marched to the US Consulate. Some Australian Trump supporters paid a skywriting company $4,000 to write "TRUMP" in the sky during the march.
New Zealand	Auckland		2,000	Because of time differences, the first women's marches held were in New Zealand. In Auckland, people marched from the US Consulate, near Britomart, up Queen Street to Myers Park.
New Zealand	Christchurch		400	Hundreds of people gathered at Victoria Square
New Zealand	Dunedin		400	Rally held in the Octagon
New Zealand	Invercargill			
New Zealand	Wellington		600 – 1,000+	At least 600 gathered at Parliament.

== Antarctica ==
Country	Locations	Photo	Approximate attendance	Notes
Antarctica	McMurdo Station		95	About 95 of McMurdo Station's 800 people marched to Hut Point, the site of the hut of the Discovery Expedition under Robert Falcon Scott. Marchers did not carry signs because nearly all poster materials at the station are U.S. Government property.
Antarctica	Paradise Bay		30	An international group of about thirty men and women, ranging in age from 24 to 87, traveled to Paradise Bay for a "pro-peace, pro-environment" march, highlighting the environmental issues that affect the Antarctica climate they feel is threatened by Trump's stated policies. Signs included "Penguins for Peace" and "Save the Planet." Their march expanded the movement to seven continents.
