= Chacala =

Beach town on the Pacific coast of Mexico

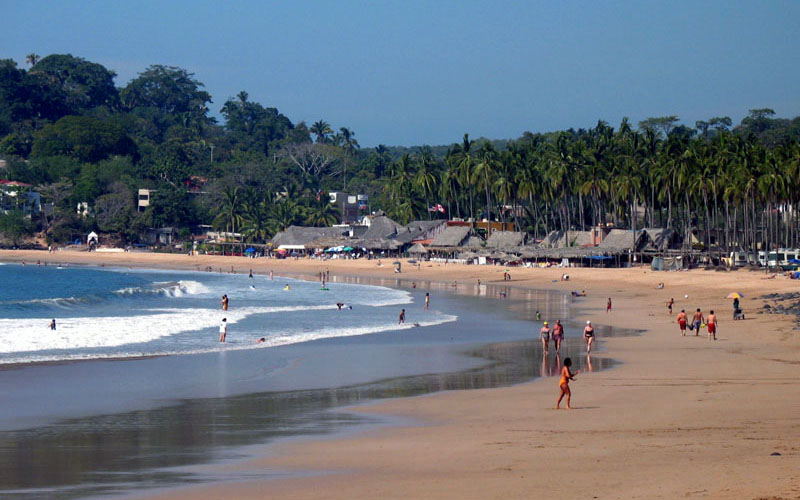

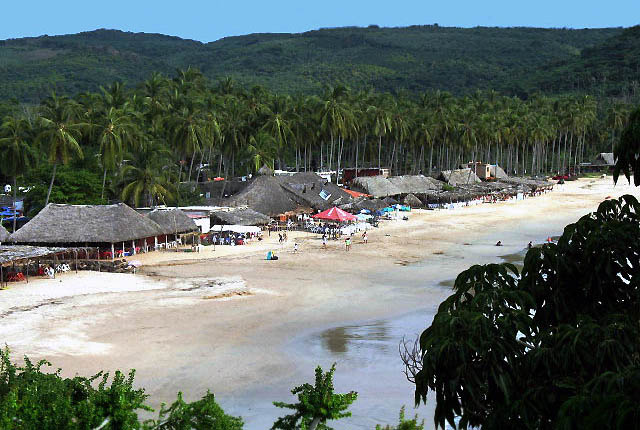

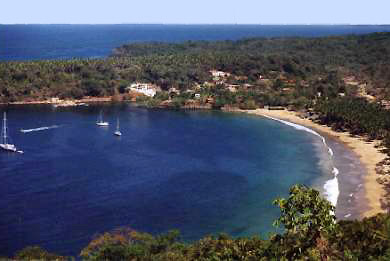

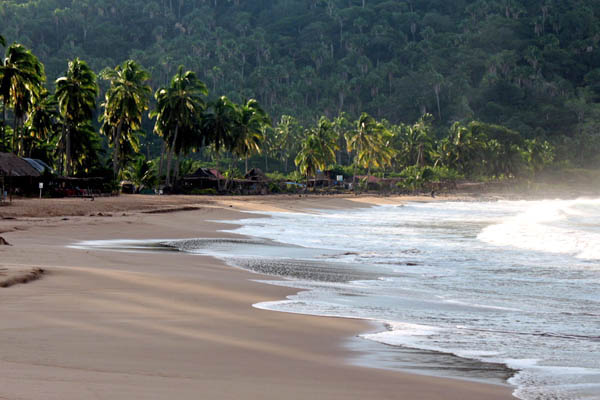

Chacala is a beach town set in small cove on the Pacific coast of Mexico in the State of Nayarit. It is located near pueblo Las Varas, about 100 kilometers (62 mi) north of Puerto Vallarta, and is part of the coastline known as the Riviera Nayarita. The name means "where there are shrimp" in Náhuatl. The population consists of approximately 300 full-time residents but can swell to over 1000 during Mexico's most popular vacation periods, such as Semana Santa (Easter Week) and Christmas. Chacala is known for its physical beauty and unhurried lifestyle.

== History ==

=== Pre-Columbian era ===
The region encompassing Nayarit and Jalisco was originally home to the Texcoxquin (Teqectequi) indigenous culture millennia before the European conquest. The Altavista petroglyphs, not far from Chacala, are believed to date from 2300 BCE. This extensive group of rock carvings is still used today for ceremonial religious purposes by the native Huichol.

=== Colonial era ===
The bay was first seen by Europeans when the Spaniard Francisco Cortés de Buena Ventura, a nephew of Hernán Cortés, reached here in 1524. Although Chacala was never as historically significant a port as San Blas to the north or Puerto Vallarta to the south, the sheltered bay saw a visit from explorer Sebastian Rodriguez Cermeño, sailing out of Manila, who arrived in Chacala on January 7, 1596, in a small launch after the Manila Galleon San Agustin was wrecked on the northern coast of California. The notable but idiosyncratic Jesuit missionary Father Eusebius Francesco Kühn, commonly known as 'Padre Kino', and his party departed from Chacala on his Atondo expedition in May 1683. Many members of the expedition abandoned him after he proposed that his ship be pushed across the Sonoran Desert.

== Geography ==
=== Location ===
21°10′N 105°13′W

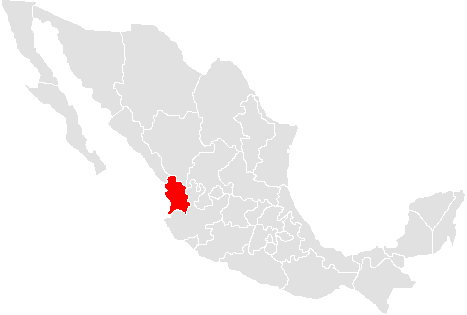

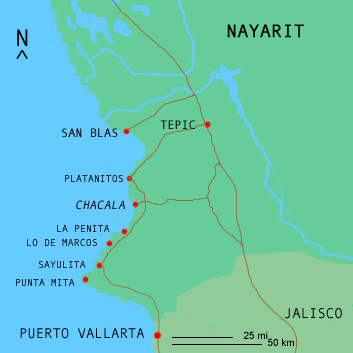

Chacala is located on the south west portion the Nayarit coast, which itself is located about mid-way on the Mexican Pacific Coast. Nayarit encompasses 27,620 square kilometers (10,660 sq mi), which makes it a little larger than the state of Maryland in the U.S.A. It has 289 kilometers (180 mi) of Pacific coastline. Nayarit is bordered by the states of Sinaloa, Zacatecas and Durango to the north, and by Jalisco to the east and south. The town is 11 kilometers (6.8 mi) off Highway 200 and is situated on the Pacific coastal plain. The coastal plain is the strip of land that runs along most of the west coast of Mexico between the Pacific Ocean and the foothills and mountains.

=== Climate ===
Chacala (and all of Nayarit) lies south of the Tropic of Cancer, thus it is located in the true tropics, and its climate is tropical – hot and humid. The actual classification is 'warm subhumid tropical'. Nayarit is characterized by its high rainfall – the fifth highest in the country, averaging 1,000–1,500 mm (39–59 in) per annum.

Some parts of the state receive up to 2,640 mm (104 in) of rainfall a year. The rains are concentrated in periods of brief intense thunderstorms, often occurring in the afternoons, most during the summer wet season between May and October, although a lesser but significant winter wet season exists as well. The wet seasons are separated by spring and fall dry seasons. Chacala received moderate to severe damage from Hurricane Kenna in October 2002.

=== Flora ===
Nayarit's natural floral habitat consists of tropical coastal savannah, tropical deciduous forest, tropical semi-deciduous forest and riparian wetland. The region also includes large and small tracts of cultivated land. The lush Nayarit jungle is home to over 300 species of orchids alone. The biodiverse tropical deciduous forests of Mexico, such as those of Nayarit's foothills and mountains, contain up to 40% of Mexico's flora and fauna diversity. Parts of the tropical deciduous forest on the Pacific Coast near Nayarit have been found to be among the top 10 most species-rich floral habitats on earth.

=== Fauna ===
The fertile coastal plain and lush jungle of the foothills and mountains of the Sierra Madre Occidental support a variety of fauna, including over 400 bird species, and a rich diversity of mammals, reptiles, amphibians, and other animal species. Some of the most notable birds include the Amazon Parrot, Tropical Kingbird, Great Kiskadee, Hooded Oriole, and the Blue-footed Booby. Mammals include a wide range of 'big cats' such as Ocelot, Margay, Jaguar, Jaguarundi and Puma along with deer, wild boar, coati mundi, skunk, badger, coyote, wild rabbit, armadillo, various snakes, lizards, and frogs.
