= Los Ayala =

Coastal community in Nayarit, Mexico

Coordinates: 21°01′27″N 105°17′12″W

Los Ayala is a small beach town and fishing village located in the municipality of Compostela, in the Mexican state of Nayarit. It is one of the three towns that make the Jaltemba Bay, the other two being Rincón de Guayabitos and La Peñita de Jaltemba, which stretches from Punta Raza on the south to Playa Boca de Naranjo on the north. As of 2015, the population of Los Ayala is 316 inhabitants.

Situated at the foot of the Sierra de Vallejo mountain range, Los Ayala is the smallest and southernmost town in Jaltemba Bay. The area is also frequented by green parakeets, pelicans, frigate birds, egrets, inca doves, white doves, tropical king birds and the lone eagle.
