= Valle de Banderas =

Town in Nayarit, Mexico

Coordinates: 20°48′N 105°14′W

Valle de Banderas (Spanish pronunciation: [ˈbaʎe ðe βanˈdeɾas]) (Spanish for Valley of the Flags) is a town in the state of Nayarit, Mexico. It is the administrative seat of the surrounding municipality of Bahía de Banderas.

== Geography ==
Valle de Banderas, locally known as El Valle, is a small town is located at the foot of the Vallejo Mountains. It is located around 20 miles (32 km) inland from the Pacific Coast at Bucerías and had a population of 5,528 in 2000.

Historical crops still being cultivated in the valley include tobacco, corn, beans and chiles. An abundance of mangoes, chirimoyos, capomos, and date palms grow in the area.

=== Climate ===
Climate data for Valle de Banderas
Month	Jan	Feb	Mar	Apr	May	Jun	Jul	Aug	Sep	Oct	Nov	Dec	Year
Mean daily maximum °C (°F)	30 (86)	30.1 (86.2)	30.7 (87.3)	32 (90)	34.0 (93.2)	34.8 (94.6)	34.8 (94.6)	34.6 (94.3)	33.5 (92.3)	33.4 (92.1)	32.7 (90.9)	30.8 (87.4)	32.6 (90.7)
Mean daily minimum °C (°F)	15 (59)	15 (59)	15.6 (60.1)	16.9 (62.4)	19 (66)	22.1 (71.8)	23 (73)	23 (73)	23.0 (73.4)	21.9 (71.4)	19.1 (66.4)	16.7 (62.1)	19.2 (66.6)
Average precipitation mm (inches)	20 (0.8)	7.6 (0.3)	5.1 (0.2)	10 (0.4)	7.6 (0.3)	120 (4.8)	180 (7.2)	290 (11.5)	260 (10.4)	61 (2.4)	20 (0.8)	18 (0.7)	1,010 (39.8)
Source: Weatherbase

== History ==
At the foot of the Vallejo Mountains in the Pre-Columbian period, "Tintoque" (Valley of the Warriors) was the village center of a small chieftainship of Cuyuteco Indians, within the larger Xalisco homeland of the Cuyuteco. They cultivated the fertile fields of the valley, rather than going to the sea, for their main food sources.

The village was renamed "Valle de Banderas" (Valley of the Flags) by Francisco Cortés de Buenaventura, the nephew of Hernán Cortés, when he conquered the Pacific coast region in 1525.

The town of Valle de Banderas, with a 140-year-old church, is the oldest and most important town in the municipality.
