= Sebastião Rodrigues Soromenho =

Portuguese explorer (c.1560–1602)

Sebastião Rodrigues Soromenho (Sebastián Rodríguez Cermeño in Spanish; c. 1560–1602), was a Portuguese explorer, born in Sesimbra (Portugal), appointed by King Philip II of Spain (Spanish: Felipe II de España; Portuguese: Filipe I de Portugal) to sail along the shores of California, in the years 1595 and 1596, in order to map the American west coast line and define the maritime routes of the Pacific Ocean in the 16th century.

== Early life ==
Little is known of Soromenho. He was probably the same man as a Sebastian Rodrigues, a pilot on the Manila Galleon Santa Ana, which was captured by Thomas Cavendish in 1587 during his circumnavigation. Soromenho had a 200-ton ship.

== Voyage ==
The Manila galleon San Agustin was sent from the Philippines to survey the coast of what became Oregon and California and then to complete the trip to Acapulco, Mexico. Carrying 130 tons of cargo, the ship displaced approximately 200 tons. Soromenho was appointed as captain for the voyage of the San Agustin based on his professional skill as a navigator.

On July 5, 1595, the San Agustin sailed from Manila with its cargo, some passengers, and some soldiers. On November 4, 1595 it reached land between Point St. George and Trinidad Head in California. Soromenho followed the coast south to Drakes Bay, anchoring on November 7. He was greeted by the Native Americans in a manner similar to that offered to Francis Drake 16 years earlier, but there was an absence of the great fear and reserve exhibited on that occasion. In late November, the San Agustin was at anchor when a large storm blew in from the south or southwest. The ship dragged anchor and sank. Several people died (accounts vary between seven and twelve) and all goods (mostly silk, wax and porcelain) were lost.

Construction on a launch which had been brought from the Philippines was completed. Nearly 80 persons sailed in the launch, now named the San Buenaventura, on December 8. Seeking the fastest route south, the expedition failed to notice San Francisco Bay. They arrived at Puerto de Chacala, Mexico, on January 17, 1596.
