= Aticama, Nayarit =

- Locality
- Location in Nayarit Aticama, Nayarit (Mexico)
- Coordinates: 21.4839°N 105.1978°W
- Country: Mexico
- State: Nayarit
- Municipality: San Blas

Population (2020)
  - Total: 1,569
- Time zone: UTC-6 (Central (US Central))
  - Summer (DST): UTC-5 (Central)

Aticama is a small farming and fishing community in Nayarit, Mexico. It is approximately 90 miles north of Puerto Vallarta and near San Blas on a stretch of coastline known as the Riviera Nayarita. Aticama's beach is known as Playa Matanchen and is one of Mexico's widest and sandiest beaches. Aticama is an important producer of rock oysters, shrimp, rock lobster, and fish such as mahi mahi and robalo. It is also a major producer of mangos and bananas. In colonial times, it was a haven for pirate ships and buccaneers on the Pacific coast.
