= Platanitos =

Town in Nayarit, Mexico

Coordinates: 21.5214°N 104.9744°W

Playa Platanitos a small beach town in the Mexican state of Nayarit. In the municipality of Compostela It is located about 20 miles south of San Blas and a few miles from the beach Las Tortugas meaning turtle. With its restaurants, small hotels and warm waters, Platanitos brings several thousand tourists each year. It is popular with intermediate surfers for its sand bottom river mouth break and northwesterly swell. More advanced surfers prefer Caleta, which is accessible only by boat. Nearby is the compound of Punto Custodio, a housing complex mainly used by Americans.
