= San Francisco, Bahía de Banderas =

Mexican town

San Francisco, Bahía de Banderas San Pancho
- Town
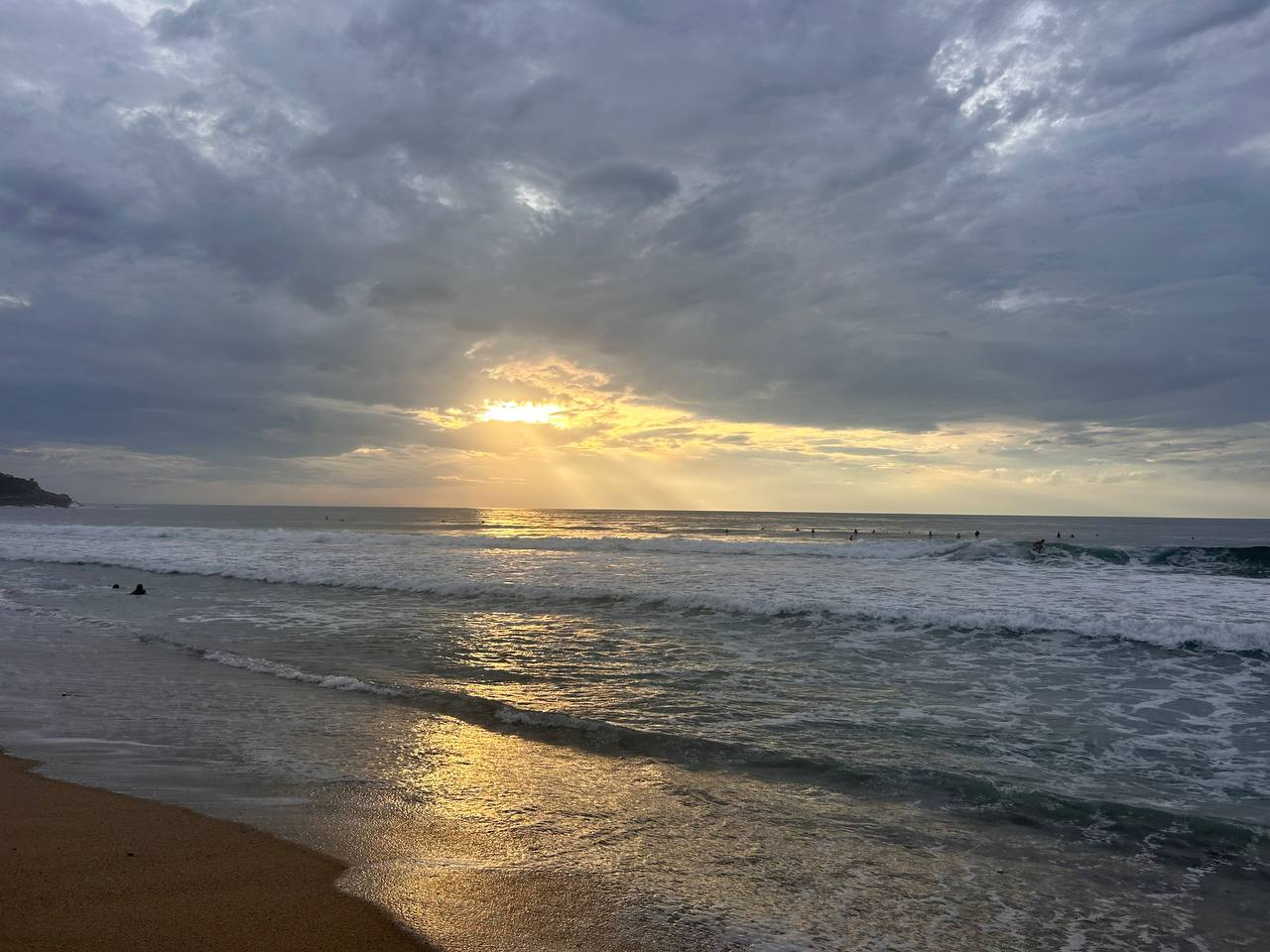
- Playa en San Francisco

- Location in Nayarit San Francisco, Bahía de Banderas (Mexico)
- Coordinates: 20.9025°N 105.4133°W
- Country: Mexico
- State: Nayarit
- Municipality: Bahía de Banderas

Population (2020)
  - Total: 1,431
- Time zone: UTC-6 (Central (US Central))
  - Summer (DST): UTC-5 (Central)

San Francisco, also known as San Pancho, is a Mexican town situated in the State of Nayarit on the central Pacific coast of Mexico about 50 km north of Puerto Vallarta on Federal Highway 200.

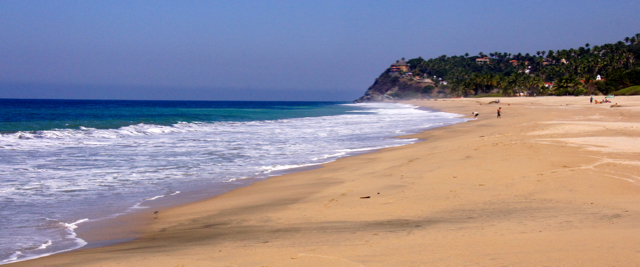
San Pancho Beach

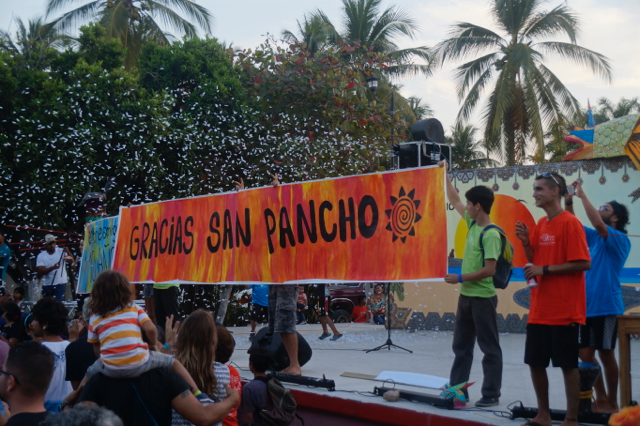
Entreamigos 10th Anniversary Celebration

== Geography, flora and fauna ==
San Francisco is situated along the Pacific coast of the Mexican state of Nayarit. The entire state of Nayarit is located south of the Tropic of Cancer and experiences a tropical, hot, and humid climate.

San Francisco is at the edge of the Sierra de Vallejo Biosphere Reserve which provides water to the inhabitants of the region, and is considered by CONABIO as a priority region for the conservation of its natural resources, plant and animal diversity. It is bordered by jungle that is home to the jaguar and scores of other exotic mammals, reptiles, amphibians, and bird species. The region is also notable for its floral diversity.

== History ==
Before the arrival of the Spanish, and still somewhat today, the coast and nearby mountainous region known as the Sierra Madre Occidental was populated by the indigenous Cora and Huichol.

As the Spanish developed ports at San Blas to the north and Puerto Vallarta to the south, the region began to increase in population but still at a much slower pace and was cut off from urban centers like Guadalajara. Franciscan priests presided along with landowners over huge latifundio estates.

Long after Mexican independence, in 1931, as part of sweeping land reform following the Mexican Revolution, the land that comprises modern-day Sayulita and San Francisco was transferred to communal ejido control.

San Francisco continued to rely on subsistence fishing and some mango and tropical fruit cultivation until the changes made by then-President Luis Echeverría in the 1970s who made it the site of his family vacation retreat. A flow of federal funding to San Francisco followed his dream of making San Francisco a “self-sufficient...Third World village” which included the present hospital and a short-lived Universidad del Tercer Mundo.

== Bird studies ==
Molina et al. (2016) made a study of the Avifauna, and report more than 40 species of birds, also Figueroa and Puebla (2014) made a research of the diversity in Sierra de Vallejo.
