= Cuyuteco =

Tribe of Nahua people

The Cuyuteco people, also known as Cuyuteca, was a tribe of the Nahua culture, that lived primarily in the Pre-Columbian Mixtlán region of Xalisco, in the present day state of Jalisco in western central Mexico and along the Colima coastline. The Nahua are one of the main cultural groups of Mesoamerica.

== History ==
The Cuyuteco people, also known as Cuyuteca, was a tribe of the Nahua culture. The Nahua are one of the main culture groups in Mesoamerica. The Cuyuteca were a Late Postclassic period group, with estimated 12th century arrival in the Xalisco region. From the migration period, and the Cuyuteco language a Uto-Aztecan Nahuatl language, they appear descended from ancient Nahua peoples that originated in Aridoamerica, in the deserts of present-day northwestern Mexico and the southwestern United States.

From the 10th to the 16th centuries, many nomadic tribes hunted game in Jalisco’s central valley. The Cuyuteco Indians lived near the present-day towns of Cuyutlán and Mixtlán, and the Coca occupied the vicinity of Guadalajara. The region extending from Guadalajara northeast to Lagos de Moreno was home to the Tecuexes.

== Present day ==
Archaeological sites are in and around the present day towns of Tecolotlán, Tenamaxtlán, Juchitlán, Atengo, and Atenguillo in Jalisco; and Valle de Banderas in Nayarit.

== See also ==
- Aztlán — legendary ancestral home
- Indigenous peoples of Mexico
- Mesoamerican chronology
- Uto-Aztecan languages
