= Bucerías, Nayarit =

Resort town in Mexico

- Locality
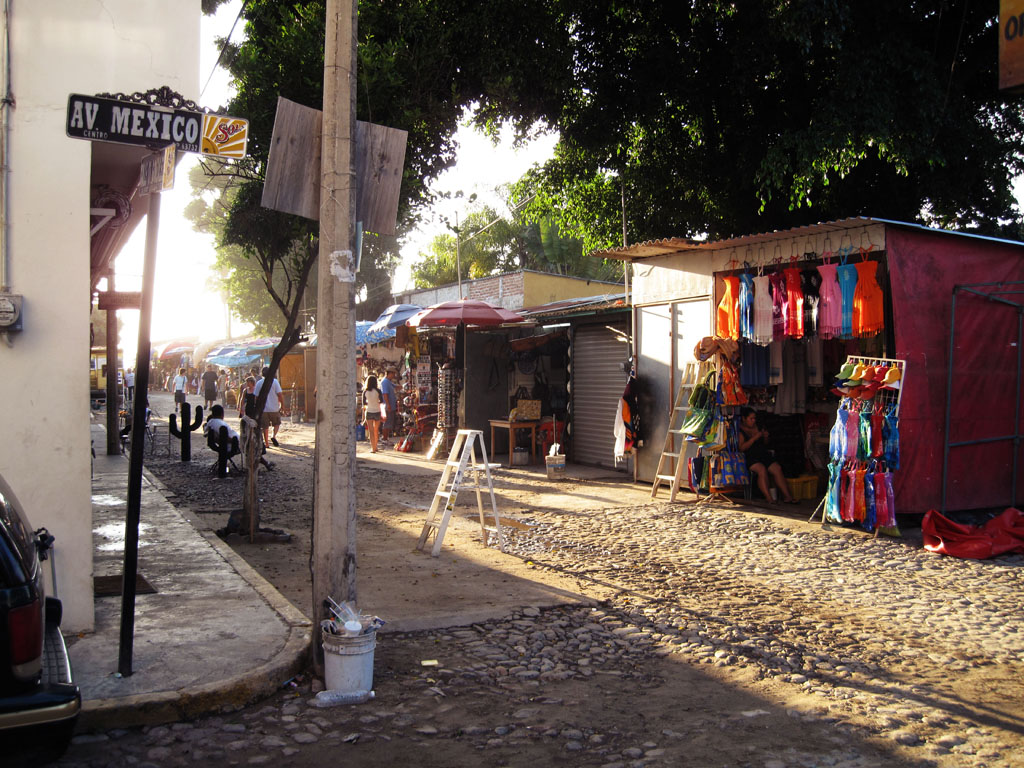
- Avenue México in Bucerías

- Location in Nayarit Bucerías, Nayarit (Mexico)
- Country: Mexico
- State: Nayarit
- Municipality: Bahía de Banderas
- Founded: 1864

Population (2020)
  - Total: 16,161
- Time zone: UTC-6 (Central (US Central))
  - Summer (DST): UTC-5 (Central)

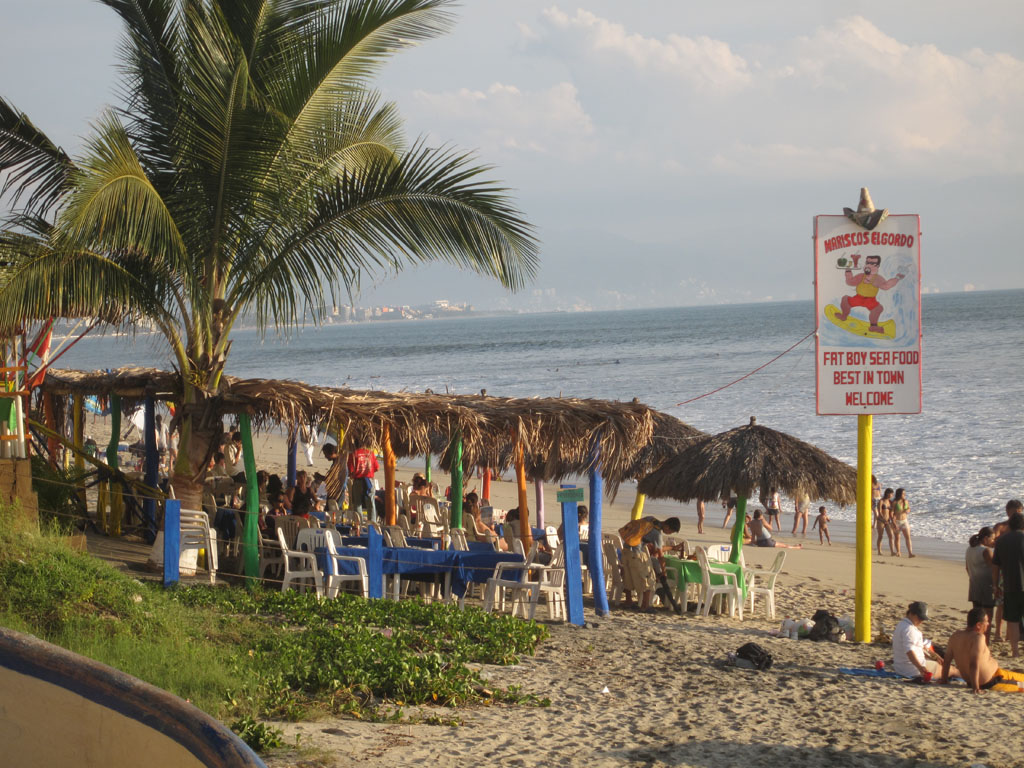
Beachfront restaurant (Puerto Vallarta in the background)

Bucerías meaning "Divers town" ("diving"), is a small Mexican beach resort town in the state of Nayarit on a stretch of Pacific coast known as the Riviera Nayarit, on and in the Bay and municipality of Banderas, between La Cruz de Huanacaxtle and Nuevo Nayarit. Its former name was Santa Julia de las Tablas.

In the 2020 census it had a population of 16,161 residents (seasonal influxes double that number) and is a typical town of the region with cobblestone streets, the main square, church, and many services for visiting foreigners, and features a wide array of restaurants. It has an uninterrupted white sand beach that continues north and south for a total of more than 29 kilometres (18 miles) and the city sits at an elevation of 27 metres (89 feet).

Bucerías is bisected by the Arroyo del Indio, a mountain run-off that remains dry most of the year. The Arroyo also serves as an unimproved roadbed under Fed 200 overpasses and can be navigated by car far up into the foothills. The half of Bucerías north of Fed 200 mostly consists of citizens; the other half south of Fed 200 beachward consists of primarily foreign residents, both permanent and part-time. Once a quaint fishing village incorporated in the 1930s, Bucerías has become a quaint tourist town since the 1980s, when primarily Canadian residents began coming for extended stays with RVs and fifth wheels; Canadians remain a very large part of the seasonal population however, Americans are moving to the city in increasing numbers with the addition of several condominium projects . The boom of all-inclusive hotels to the south in Nuevo Nayarit—a development extending from the north end of Puerto Vallarta—has driven building in Bucerías as well, although in a more muted way. Buildings rarely exceed seven floors, and the units are a condominium, rather than hotel style.

Each January the town celebrates Our Lady of Peace (La Virgen de la Paz), who is the patron of the local Catholic church. There is a large and vibrant street bazaar featuring traditional regional art and textiles.
