= List of squares in Zagreb =

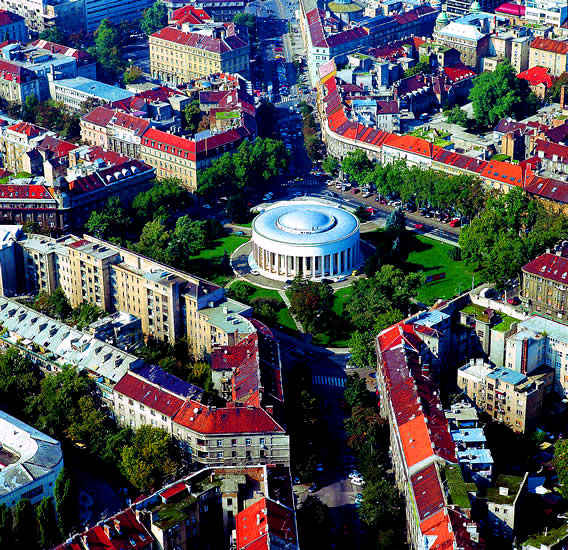
Square of the Victims of Fascism

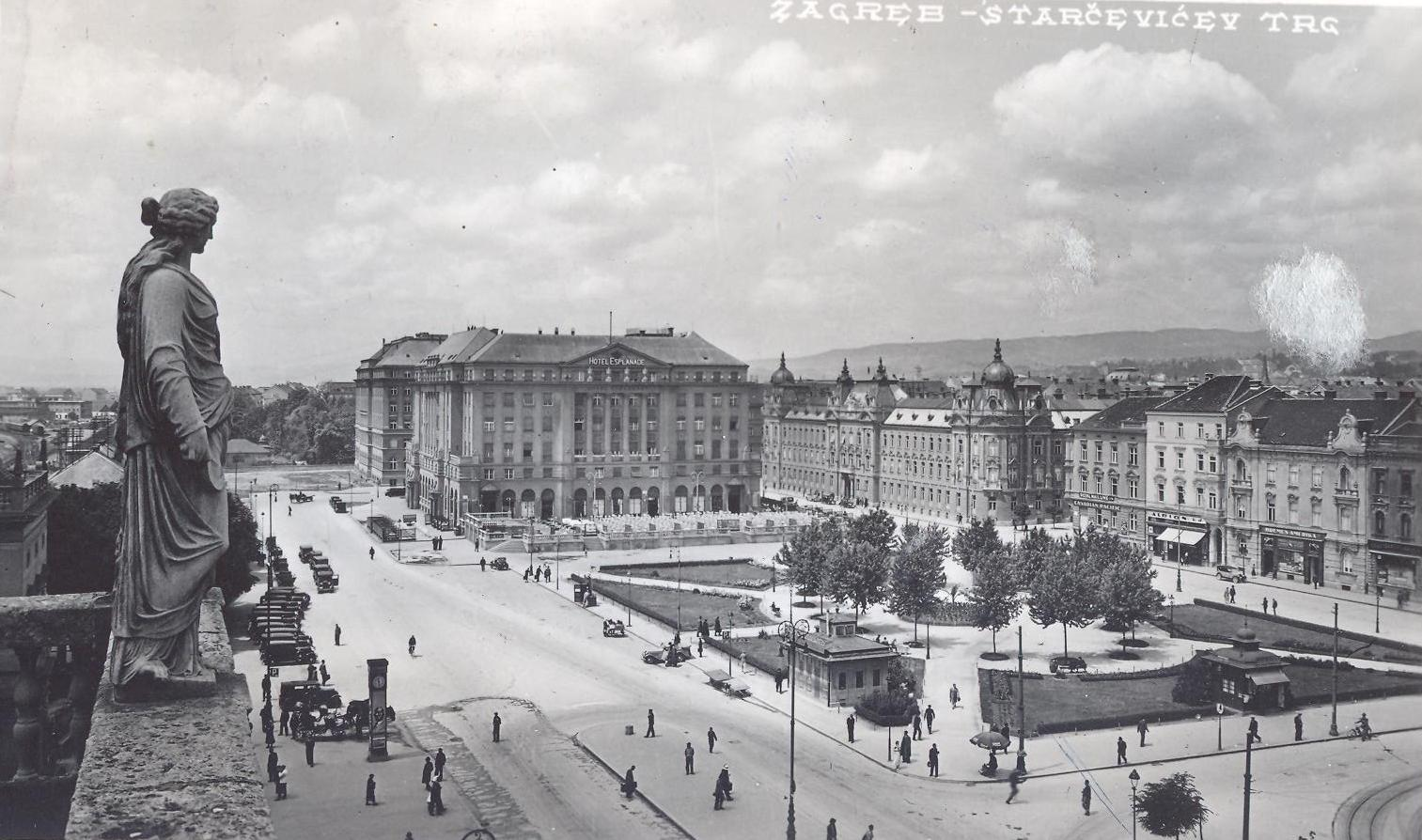
Ante Starčević Square

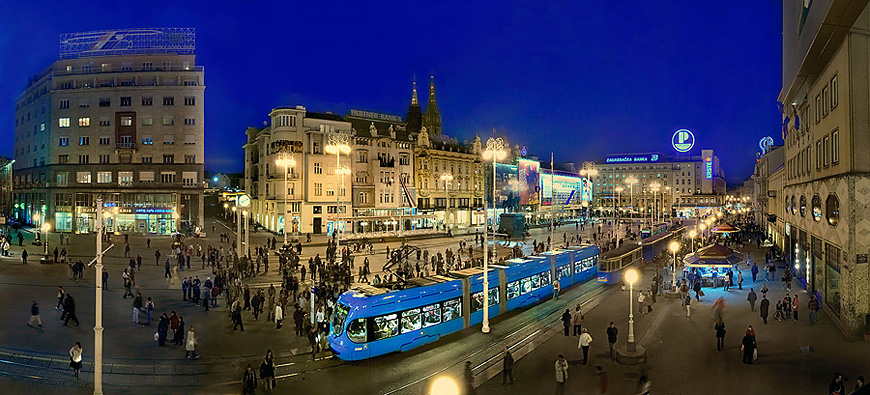
Ban Jelačić Square

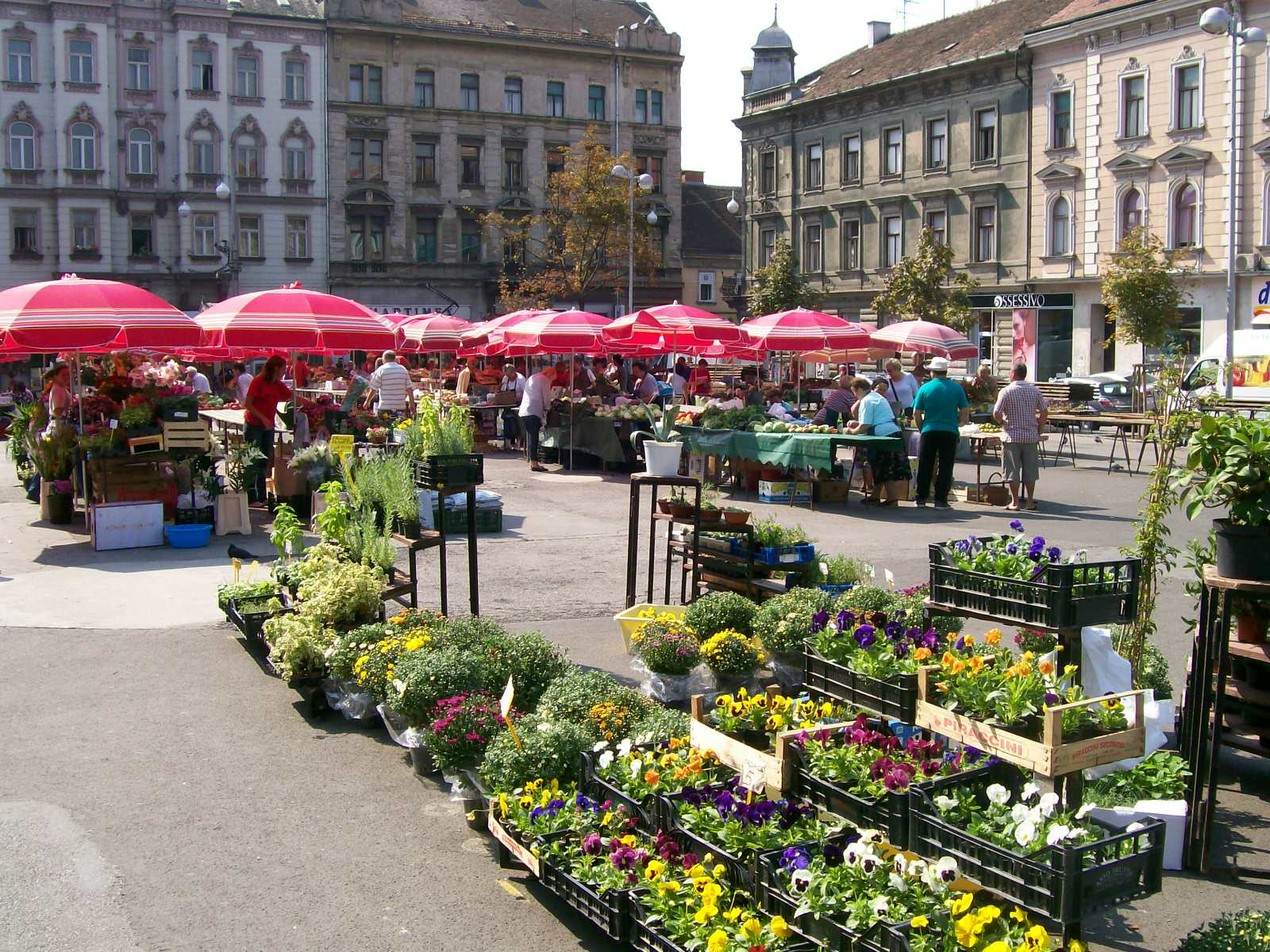
British Square

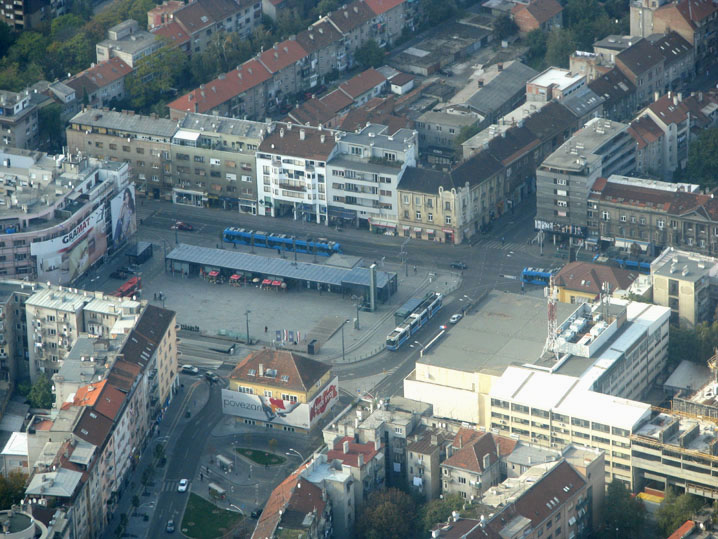
Eugen Kvaternik Square from the air

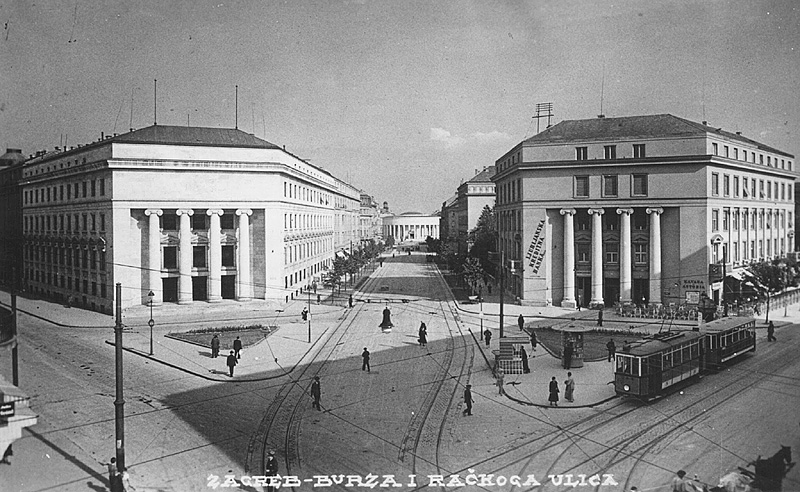
Square in 1930's

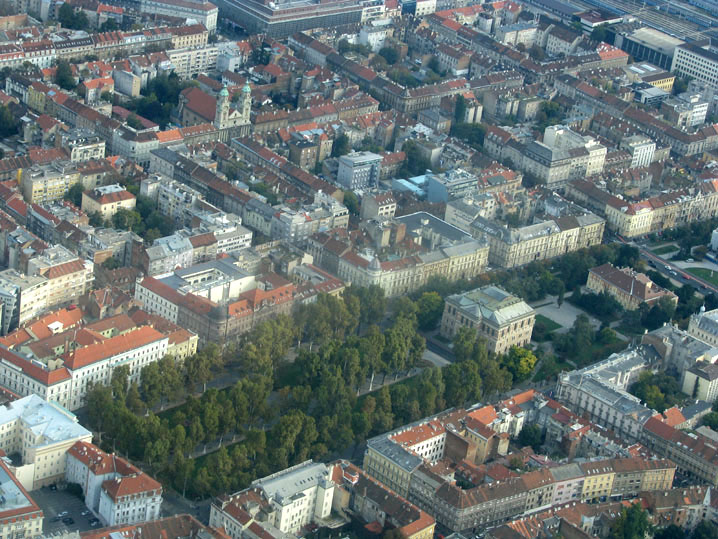
Zrinjevac - aerial view

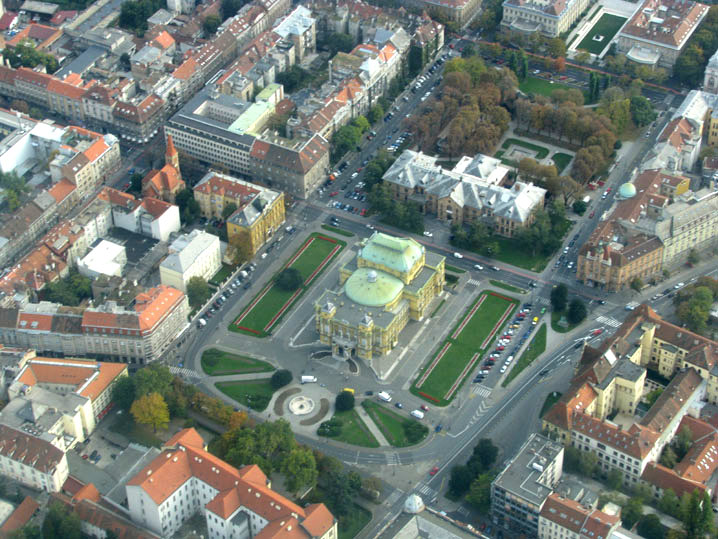
Aerial view of the Republic of Croatia Square

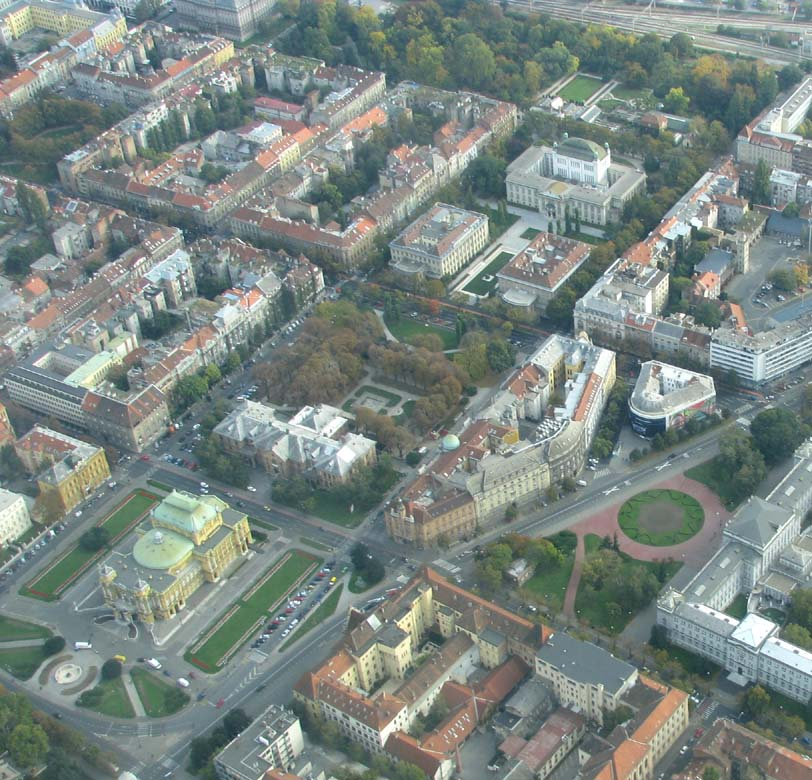
Western and southern side of the Lenuci Horseshoe viewed from northwest

List of squares in Zagreb lists all squares in the City of Zagreb.

- Barčev trg
- Britanski trg
- Cvjetni trg (Trg Petra Preradovića)
- Dječji trg
- Dubravkin trg
- Horvaćanski trg (settlement Horvati)
- Ilički trg
- Ilirski trg
- Istarski trg
- Jezuitski trg
- Kninski trg
- Naserov trg
- Nehruov trg
- Opatijski trg
- Podsusedski trg
- Šestinski trg
- Trešnjevački trg
- Trg 101. brigade Hrvatske vojske Susedgrad
- Trg 145. brigade Hrvatske vojske Dubrava
- Trg Ane Rukavine
- Trg Ante Starčevića
- Trg Antuna Mihanovića
- Trg Antuna, Ivana i Vladimira Mažuranića
- Trg Augustina Kažotića
- Trg bana Josipa Jelačića
- Trg botinečkih branitelja
- Trg Braće hrvatskoga zmaja
- Trg dr. Eugena Kvaternika
- Trg dr. Franje Tuđmana
- Trg dr. Vladka Mačeka
- Trg Drage Iblera
- Trg Dragutina Domjanića (Sesvete)
- Trg Dražena Petrovića
- Europe Square, Zagreb
- Trg Francuske Republike
- Trg Franklina Roosvelta
- Trg Franje Markovića
- Trg grada Passignano sul Trasimeno
- Trg hrvatskih branitelja Domovinskog rata (settlement Hrvatski Leskovac)
- Trg Hrvatskih obrambenih snaga
- Trg hrvatskih Pavlina
- Trg hrvatskih velikana
- Trg Ivana Kukuljevića Sakcinskog
- Trg Ivana Meštrovića
- Trg Johna Fitzgeralda Kennedyja
- Trg Josipa Jurja Strossmayera
- Trg Josipa Jurja Strossmayera (settlement Popovec)
- Trg Josipa Langa
- Trg Jurja Muliha (settlement Hrašće Turopoljsko)
- Trg kardinala Franje Šepera
- Trg Katarine Zrinske
- Trg kralja Petra Krešimira IV.
- Trg kralja Tomislava
- Trg kralja Tomislava (Sesvete)
- Trg Lovre Matačića (Sesvete)
- Trg Luke Botića
- Trg Marka Marulića
- Trg Republike Hrvatske
- Trg Milovana Zoričića
- Trg Narodne zaštite
- Trg Nevenke Topalušić
- Trg Nikole Šubića Zrinskog
- Trg Nikole Tesle (Sesvete)
- Trg Otokara Keršovanija
- Trg Palih Boraca (settlement Blaguša)
- Trg Palih Boraca (settlement Jesenovec)
- Trg Petra Petretića
- Trg Petra Preradovića
- Trg Petra Svačića
- Trg Republike Hrvatske
- Trg Senjskih Uskoka
- Trg Siječanjskih žrtava 1945.
- Trg Slavoljuba Penkale
- Trg sportova
- Trg Stenjevec
- Trg Stjepana Konzula
- Trg Stjepana Radića
- Trg svete Klare
- Trg svete Marije Čučerske
- Trg Svetog Križa
- Trg svetog Marka
- Trg svetog Šimuna
- Trg Svetog Trojstva (settlement Moravče)
- Trg Svibanjskih žrtava 1995.
- Trg Vlaha Bukovca
- Trg Volovčica
- Trg žrtava fašizma
- Trg žrtava fašizma (settlement Glavnica Donja)
- Zeleni trg
