= Altavista petroglyph complex =

Archaeological site in Nayarit, Mexico

Coordinates: 21°05′30″N 105°10′00″W

Petroglyphs at Altavista Site, Compostela, Nayarit.

The Altavista petroglyph complex is located near the village and beach-town of Chacala, south of the Compostela Municipality, in Nayarit, Mexico.

The area is known as "La Pila del Rey", "Chacalán", "El Santuario", "The Petroglyphs” or "the Altavista petroglyphs", near the Jaltemba Bay, in the Pacific Ocean of Nayarit.

This region was originally home to the largely unstudied Tecoxquin (Tequectequi) native culture dating from approximately 2000 BC to 2300 BCE. It contains 56 petroglyphs whose antiquity cannot be accurately determined. Aside from its cultural and archeological importance, the site remains an important religious center for the Huicholes who still leave offerings and perform ceremonies here.

In prehispanic times, the Compostela municipality area was inhabited by the Mazatán peoples, tributary of Xalisco-Zacualpan Kingdom.
