= La Peñita de Jaltemba =

- Locality
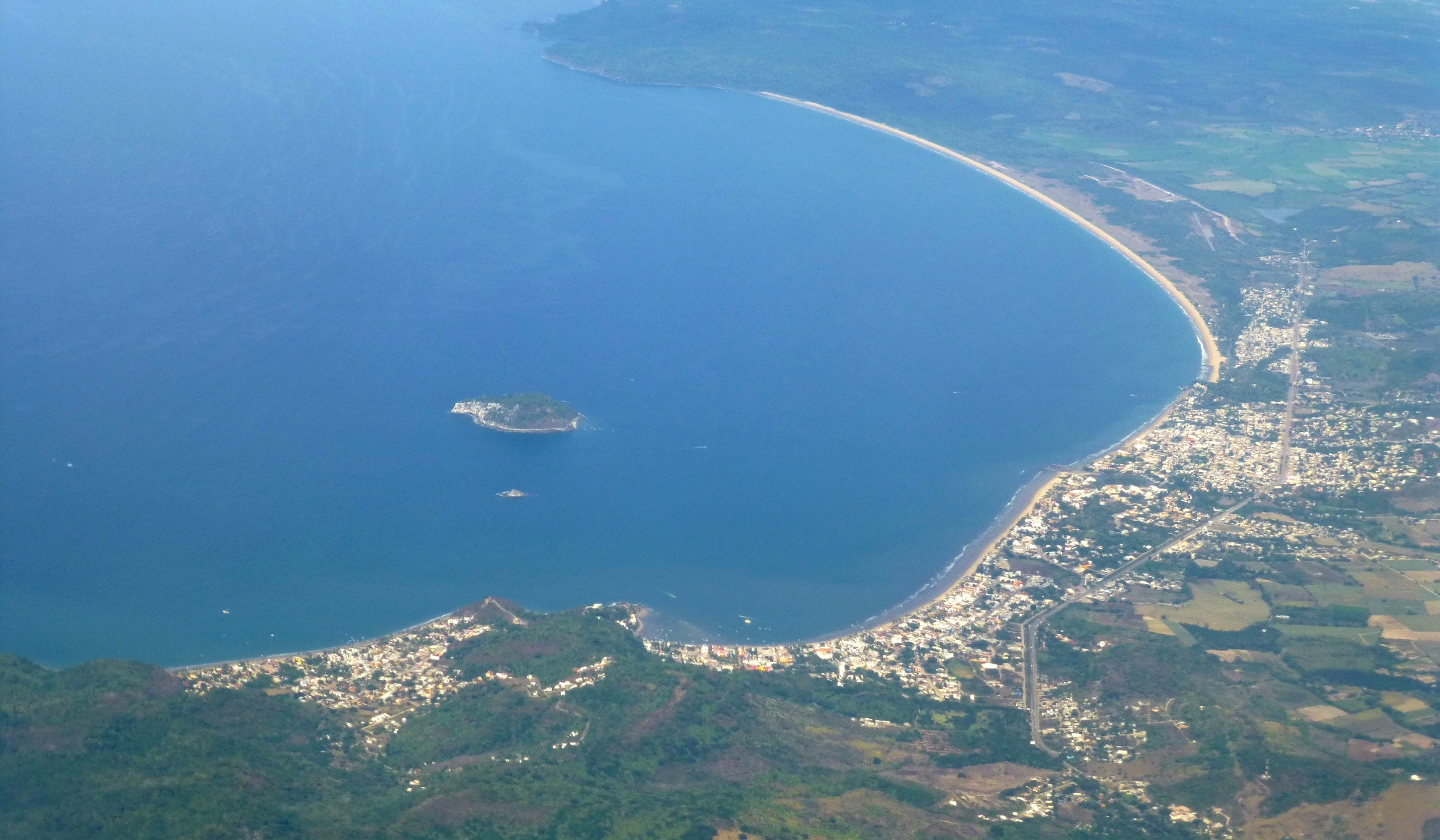
- Aerial view of the town, Rincón de Guayabitos, and the Isla Coral

- Location in Nayarit La Peñita de Jaltemba (Mexico)
- Coordinates: 21.038518°N 105.246965°W
- Country: Mexico
- State: Nayarit
- Municipality: Compostela

Population (2020)
  - Total: 10,593
- Time zone: UTC-7 (Pacific Pacific Standard Time Zone)

La Peñita de Jaltemba, commonly called La Peñita, is a small beach town in Nayarit, Mexico, with a population of approximately 20,000 inhabitants. It is located on Jaltemba Bay, 64 kilometers north of Puerto Vallarta at kilometer 90 on Mexico Highway 200.

The surrounding area is noted for pineapple, banana, mango, and other fruit production. The main street, or "La Avenida" as it is known, runs east–west from the highway to the beach and has a central boulevard lined with palm trees and benches. A number of tourist shops, clothing stores, shoe stores, restaurants, and other merchants face the street. Two blocks south of the beach end of La Avenida there is a large shady plaza. Each Thursday, a four-block long tianguis (street market) takes place in La Peñita de Jaltemba. This market sells a wide range of goods, from fresh fruits, vegetables, and seafoods to housewares, clothing, hardware, and arts and crafts.

It is the main service community for the busy resort of Rincón de Guayabitos immediately to the south. The two communities are separated only by a narrow river. Rincón de Guayabitos is a community of hotels, bungalows, small tourist shops, and restaurants, while La Peñita de Jaltemba provides banking services, grocery stores, and vegetable markets, as well as public facilities such as the library and post office.

Transport: In La Peñita de Jaltemba at the east end of La Avenida, where it meets Highway 200, the shuttle system (colectivos) is available to transport you between the communities for a fee of 9 pesos (2014). It runs from La Colonia through La Peñita de Jaltemba and Rincón de Guayabitos to Los Ayala and back, making stops where requested. Taxis too are inexpensive, costing about 40 pesos from Guayabitos to La Peñita de Jaltemba (2015). Bus service to Puerto Vallarta is regularly scheduled, running every 20-30 minutes.

Two main service clubs serve the area: the Jaltemba Bay Rotary Club - La Peñita and Los Amigos de Jaltemba.
