= Sayulita =

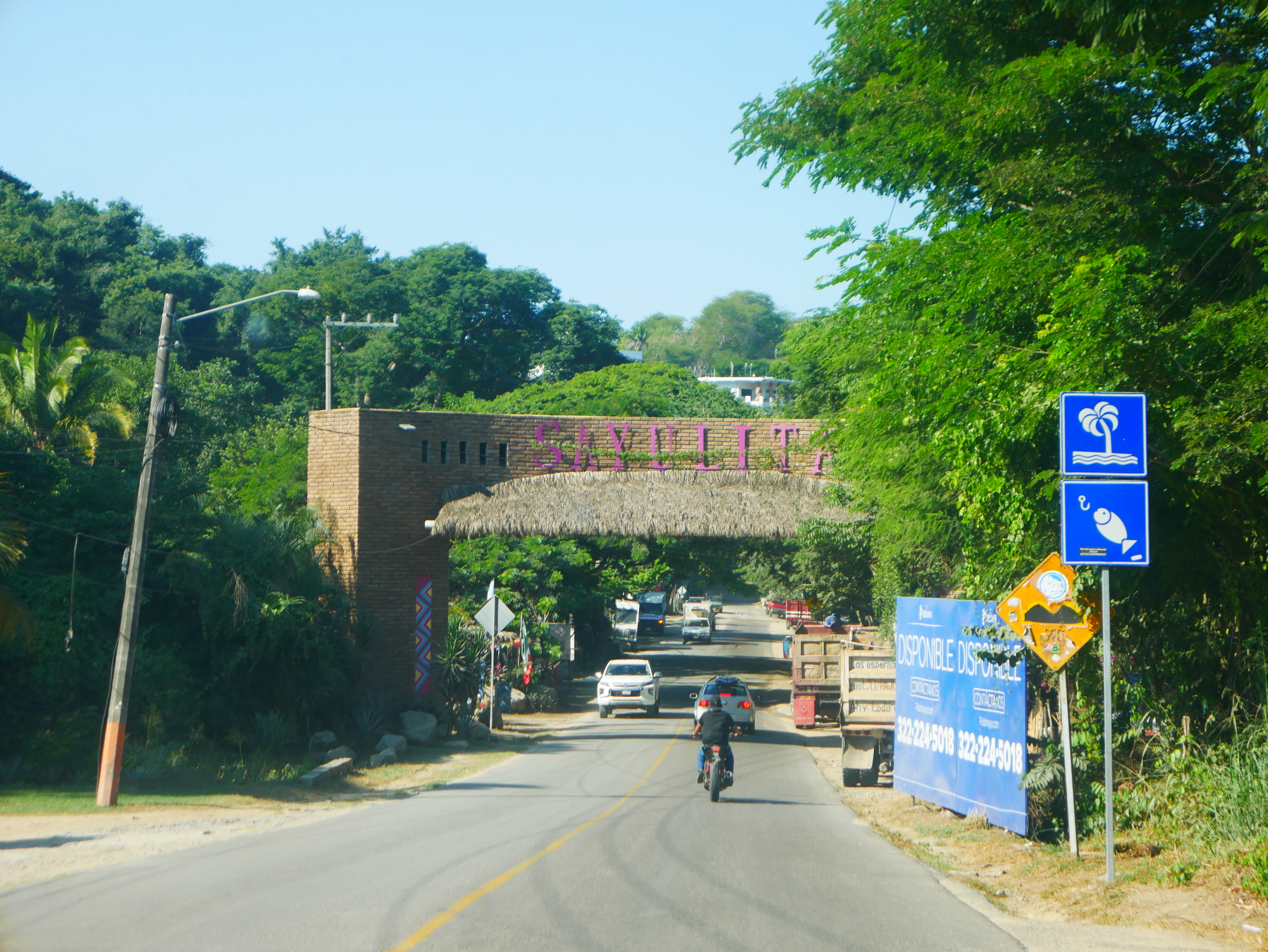
- Entrance to Sayulita

- Location of Sayulita within Mexico Sayulita (Mexico)
- Coordinates: 20°52′10″N 105°26′27″W
- Country: Mexico
- State: Nayarit
- Region: Banderas Bay
- Municipality: Bahía de Banderas

Population (2020)
  - Total: 3,390
- Time zone: UTC-7 (Central Time)
  - Summer (DST): UTC-6
- Postal code: 63734
- Area codes: 329 322

Sayulita is a small town in Mexico along the Pacific Ocean at the southern end of the state of Nayarit and north of Banderas Bay. It has a population of approximately 5,000 inhabitants.

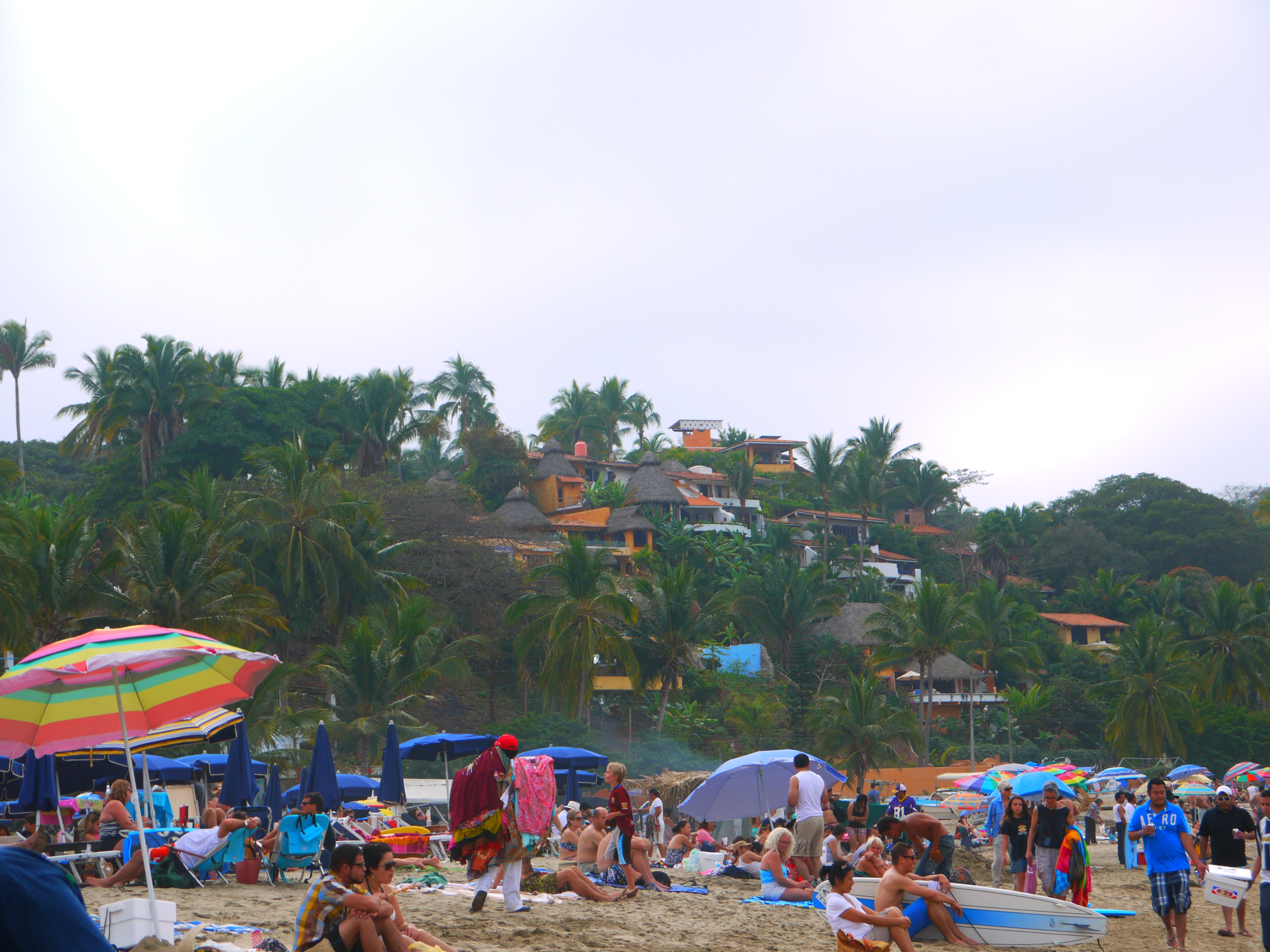
People at Sayulita Beach (Spanish: Playa Sayulita), a sign of tourism in the area.

== Etymology ==
According to information collected by the historian of Sayula, Jalisco, the name Sayulita was given by Mr. Don Lauro González Guerra to honour his hometown, Sayula. The word Sayulita is a diminutive of Sayula, which in Nahuatl comes from Tzaulan, meaning "place where flies abound," which in turn derives from zayolin, the Nahuatl word for fly.

== History ==
Early inhabitants of Sayulita were drawn to the area to work on coconut palm ranches, where coconut oil was extracted from the palm species Attalea cohune. During the coconut oil boom, many people died of lung diseases caused by inhaling the dust that the coconuts gave off when split. The hacienda grew, and in addition to oil production, it soon became an important livestock emporium. In 1936, the livestock were sold and the land donated to the port workers with the intention to continue producing, leading to the formation of the Sayulita ejido.

In the 1940s, coconut production was reduced considerably, leading agriculture and fisheries to become the primary industries of the area. Though less abundant than the past, species fished commercially in the region include snapper, horse mackerel, sawfish, grouper, oyster, shrimp and lobster.

In 1965 the La Varas-Puerto Vallarta highway was built, which helped inaugurate tourism into the region. As a part of a tourism expansion and development project, Sayulita's streets were paved, and public works such as kiosks, public squares, markets, and sidewalks were built.

== Tourism ==
Tourism in Sayulita is highest during the winter season. The beach has been visited by surfers since the 1960s. Every year, thousands of tourists visit the town on the way to and from Puerto Vallarta and Banderas Bay.

== Fauna ==
Terrestrial animals local to the Sayulita area include armadillos, coati, rattlesnakes, iguanas, chachalacas, wild boars and deer.

== Fishing ==
Locals fish for dorado, tuna, sierra, marlin, guachinango, juriel, cherna, sailfish, and roosterfish, along with shrimp, lobster and oyster.
