= Rincón de Guayabitos =

- Locality
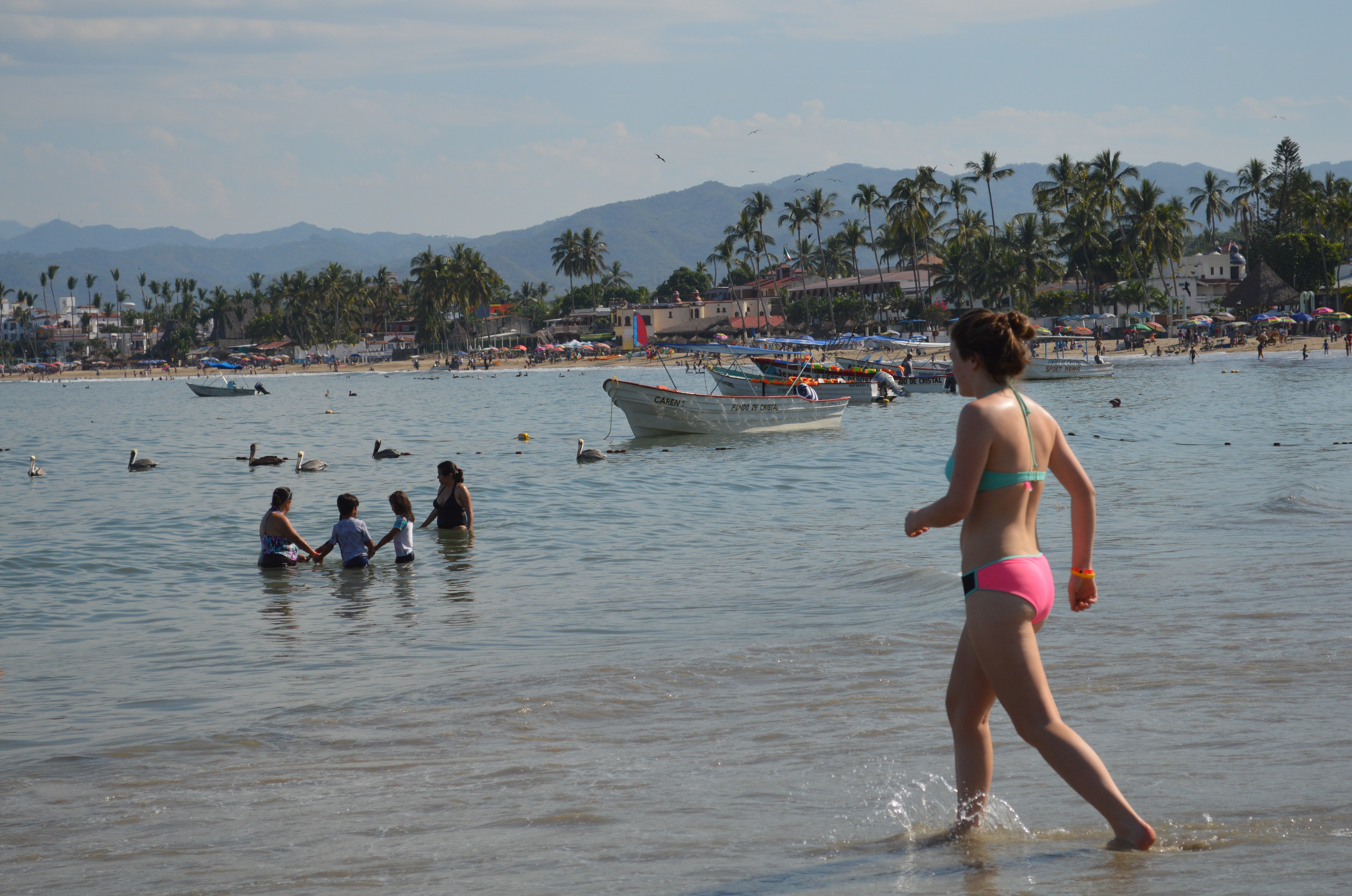

- Location in Nayarit Rincón de Guayabitos (Mexico)
- Coordinates: 21.03°N 105.27°W
- Country: Mexico
- State: Nayarit
- Municipality: Compostela

Population (2020)
  - Total: 2,777
- Time zone: UTC-7 (Mountain (US Mountain))

Rincón de Guayabitos (also known simply as Guayabitos) is a popular beach resort area located in the municipality of Compostela, in the Mexican state of Nayarit. The resort area occupies about two km of beachfront and is a popular vacation places due to its gentle waves and proximity to the cities of Tepic and Guadalajara. However, its popularity has led to problems such as the lack of hotel accommodations and little-regulated street vending. Guayabitos is just two kilometers north of the smaller beach town of Los Ayala.

== Attractions ==
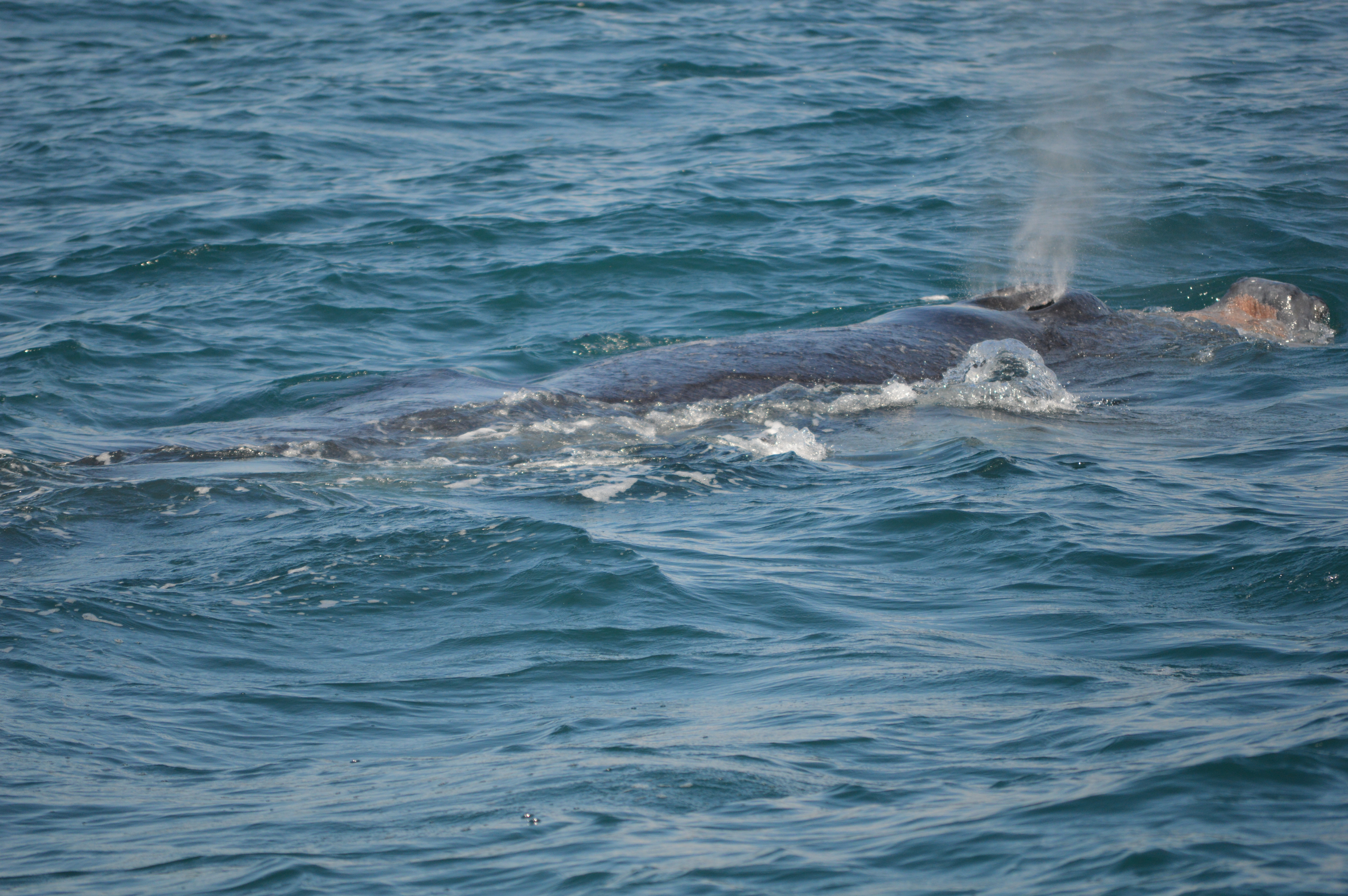
Whale sighted off Guayabitos

Rincón de Guayabitos (which translates to “Corner of the small guava trees”) is a beach community popular for its gentle waves, reasonable prices and location, being 98 km from the state capital of Tepic and 220 km from Guadalajara. Most of the lodging here are bungalows and hotel rooms with kitchen facilities, as it is popular here to buy seafood and other foodstuffs to cook on the beach or at the hotel room. Most of the fish is sold in the early morning, when fishermen return with their catches which include dorados (Salminus brasiliensis), mojarras and red snapper.

The area also offers swimming, baby turtle releases, and boat tours, including whale watching when in season. It also hosts an annual event called Paraiso del Sol 99, organized by the Universidad de Guadalajara, which has competitions in mountain biking and a duathlon. Another event is the “Acuatlon” where participants run three km, swim one and run another three km and the “Aquathon” a 6 km swimming event.

== Problems ==
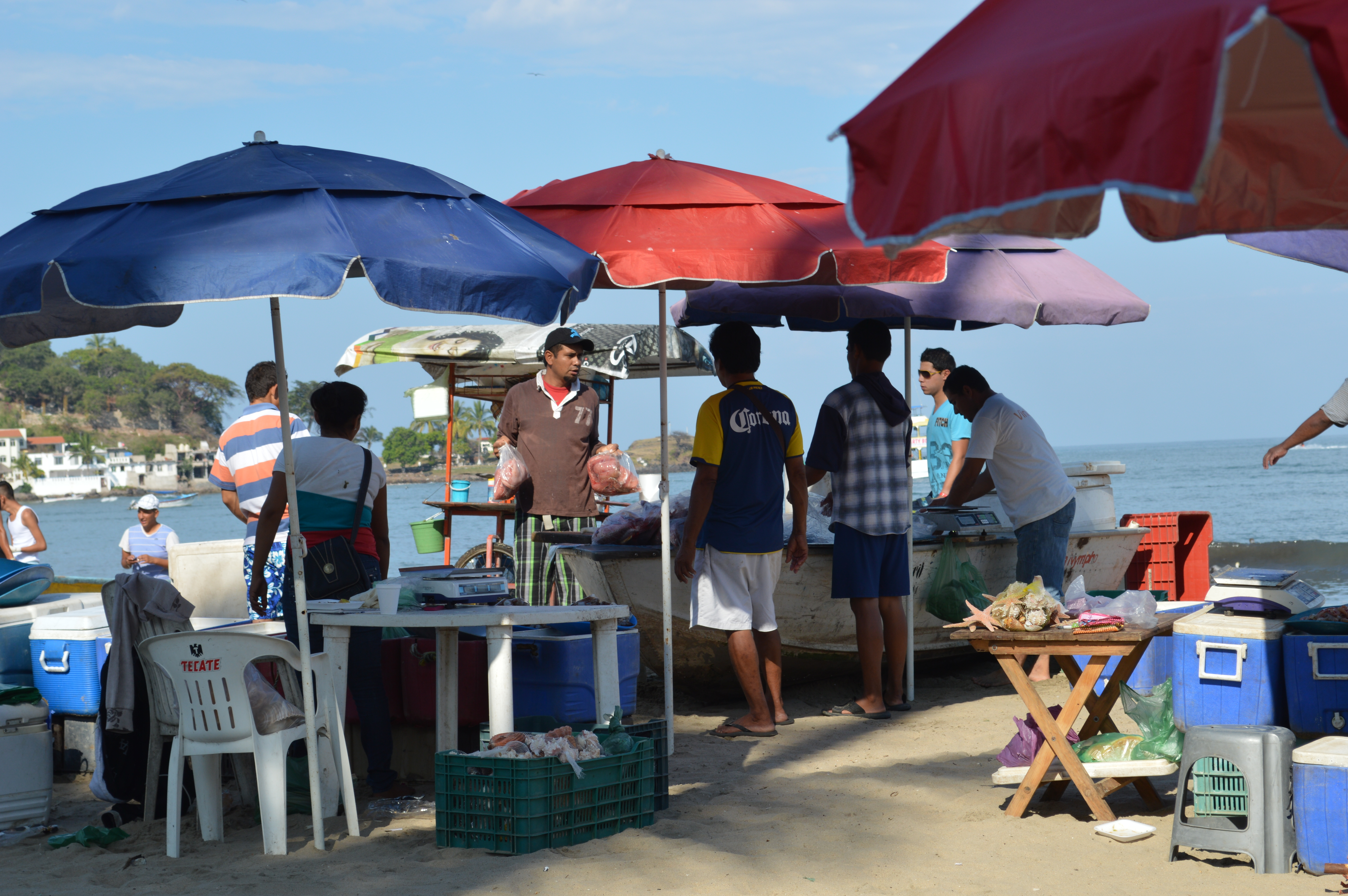
Fishermen selling catch on the beach

Because of its proximity to major urban areas and its popularly, Guayabitos hotels can fill up months in advance, with one of highest hotel occupancy rates in Mexico, just behind Manzanillo and Isla Mujeres. This is one reason why it is also popular for visiting families to camp on the beach. However, hotels and other businesses near the beach complain about campers’ trash, noise and public drunkenness.

Another issue is the nearly uncontrolled street vendors on the beach and streets of the area, selling fresh fish, juices, bread, milk and prepared foods to tourists. Only about a quarter of the estimated 1,200 vendors are registered with authorities. In 2014, the community joined a national program to help organize commerce in the beach area.
