= Las Varas, Nayarit =

Human settlement in Mexico

Coordinates: 21.1794°N 105.1353°W

Las Varas is a small town located in the state of Nayarit, Mexico, about 100 km north of Puerto Vallarta, and is part of the Compostela municipality. As of the 2020 census, the population of the town was 14,419. The economy is largely based around agriculture, as it is surrounded by fruit, tobacco, and bean farms.
