= La Cruz de Huanacaxtle =

La Cruz de Huanacaxtle La Cruz
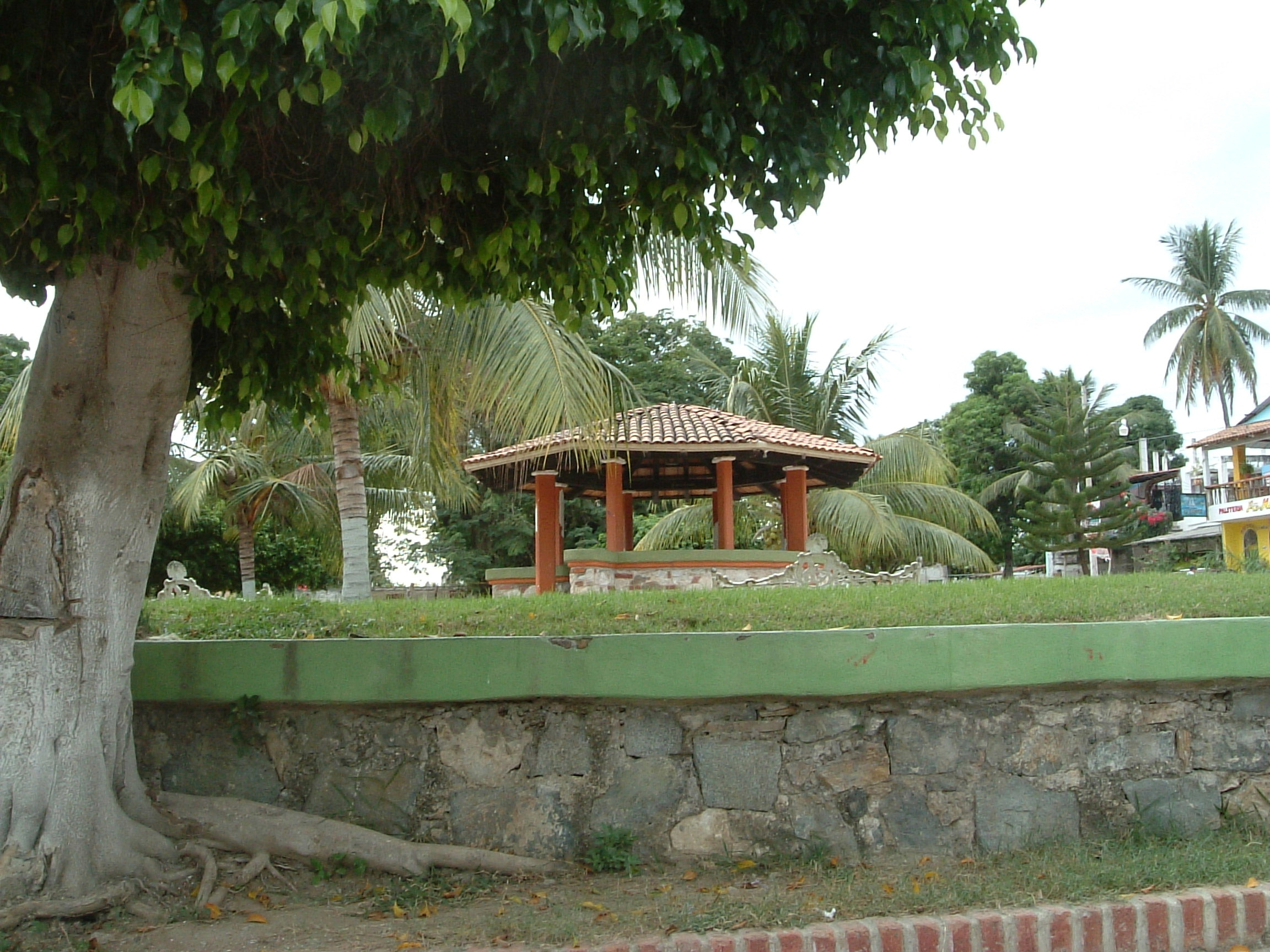
- Kiosk in La Cruz de Huanacaxtle
- Interactive map of La Cruz de Huanacaxtle
- Coordinates: 20°44′56″N 105°22′56″W
- Country: Mexico
- State: Nayarit
- Municipality: Bahía de Banderas
- Founded: 1930s

Population (2020)
  - Total: 4,169
- Time zone: UTC-6 (CST)
- Area code: 329

La Cruz de Huanacaxtle (Spanish for "The Cross of Huanacaxtle") is a Mexican fishing village situated on the Pacific Ocean's Bahía de Banderas in the state of Nayarit. It is situated approximately 25 km from Puerto Vallarta, Jalisco. The town name comes from a cross that is made of Huanacaxtle wood which is located at the town's entrance.

== History ==
The town was founded in the 1930s by the Chávez family. The Chávez family still maintains a mango orchard on the outskirts of town. The Blanca family was also one of the original settlers of La Cruz, as it is locally known. They, too, remain residents.

In 2008, a major renovation of the harbor was completed and now hosts a marina, called Marina Riviera capable of handling vessels of up to 400 feet in length.
