= Bahía de Banderas =

Human settlement in Mexico

Coordinates: 20.649491°N 105.382233°W

- Municipality
- Top: Punta de Mita panoramic view. Middle: Sayulita, Islas Marietas National Park. Bottom: Bucerías, San Francisco town

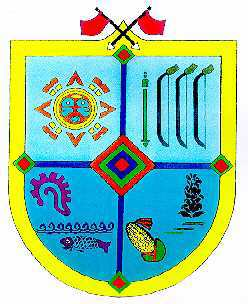
- Coat of arms

- Location in Mexico Bahía de Banderas (Mexico)
- Country: Mexico
- State: Nayarit
- Municipal seat: Valle de Banderas
- Largest city: San Vicente

Government
  - Federal electoral district: Nayarit's 3rd

Area
  - Municipality: 771.4 km^{2} (297.8 sq mi)

Population (2020)
  - Municipality: 187,632
  - Density: 243.2/km^{2} (630.0/sq mi)
- Demonym: (in Spanish)
- Time zone: UTC−06:00 (Zona Centro)

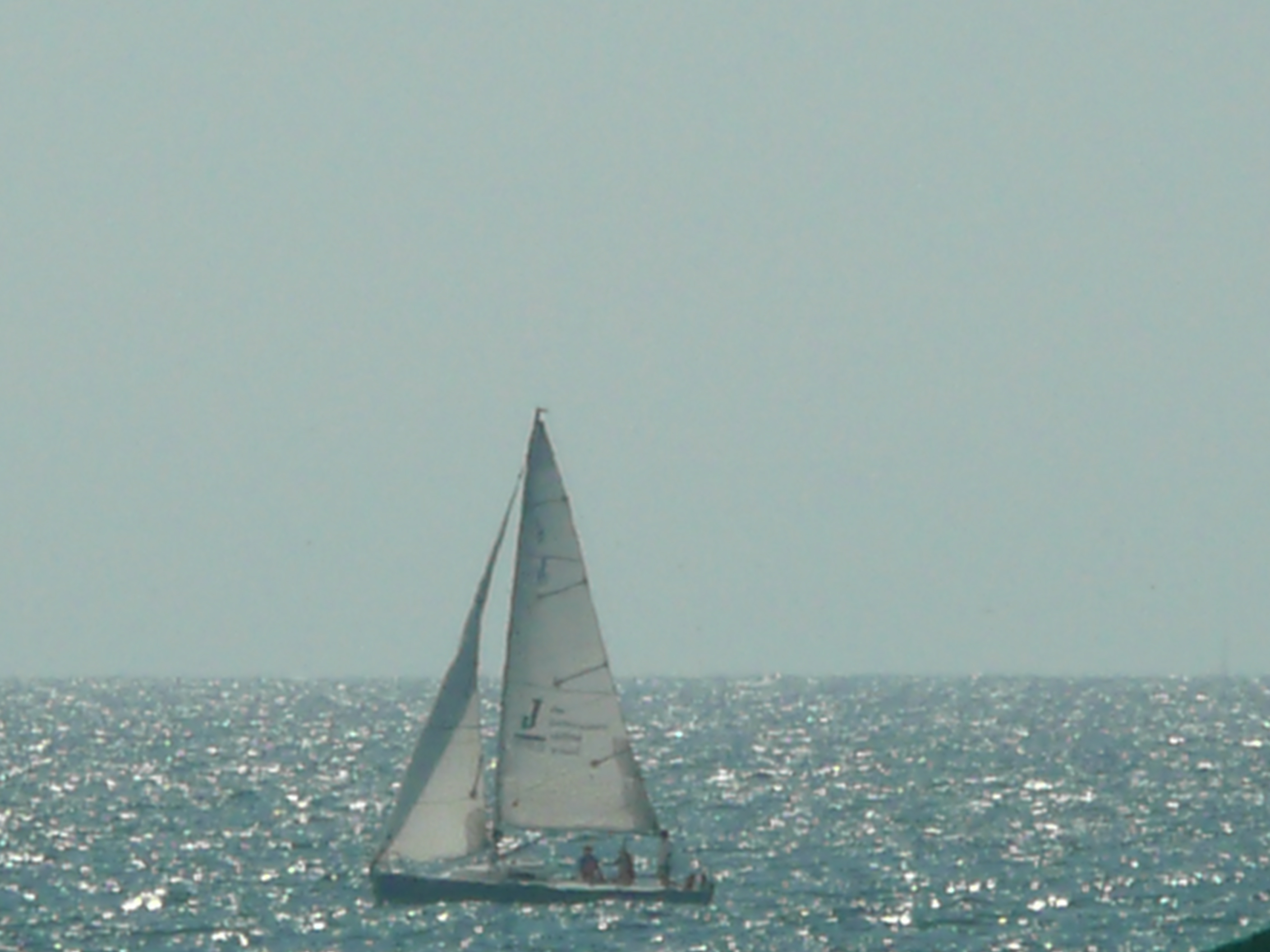
Boat on the Bahía de Banderas (Bay of Flags).

Bahía de Banderas (Spanish pronunciation: [ba'i.a ðe βan'deɾas], Spanish for Bay of Flags) is a bay on the Pacific Coast of Mexico, within the Mexican states of Jalisco and Nayarit, being the westernmost municipality in Nayarit. It is also the name of an administrative municipality, located on the bay in Nayarit state. The port and resort city of Puerto Vallarta is on the bay.

== Geology ==
The Bahía de Banderas is regarded by most geologists as the original attachment point for the southern cape of the Baja California Peninsula before it was rifted off the North American Plate millions of years ago, forming the Gulf of California.

== Geography ==
Map of the Municipality of Bahía de Banderas, with towns.

The Bahía de Banderas (Banderas Bay) on the Pacific Ocean is bounded on the north by Punta Mita (Mita Point), and on the south by Cabo Corrientes (Cape Corrientes). Its coastline is approximately 100 kilometres (62 mi) long.

== Municipality ==
The Municipality of Bahía de Banderas in Nayarit state has a total area of 773.3 km^{2}. It was created in 1989. Its westernmost headland is Punta Mita, to the south it is on the Bahía de Banderas, and northwards it is on the open Pacific Ocean.

The municipality had a population of 83,739 in 2005 (59,808 in 2000). The long valley of Banderas, and abundance of water, allow for extensive cattle raising. The mountains contain an important ecological reserve in the eastern section.

By Decree number 7261, issued on 11 December 1989 by the Congress of the Free and Sovereign State of Nayarit, the new municipality of Bahía de Banderas was created, which would separate it territorially from the municipality of Compostela, becoming part of the political division of the state of Nayarit as municipality number 20.

=== Location ===
The municipality of Bahía de Banderas borders Compostela in Nayarit to the north; the municipalities of Puerto Vallarta and San Sebastián del Oeste, both in Jalisco, to the south, the southeast, and the east; and the Bahía de Banderas and the Pacific Ocean to the west.

=== Demographics ===
Historical population
Year	Pop.	±%
1990	39,831	—
1995	47,077	+18.2%
2000	59,808	+27.0%
2005	83,739	+40.0%
2010	124,025	+48.1%
2015	150,250	+21.1%
2020	187,632	+24.9%

As 2020, Bahía de Banderas had a population of 187,632 inhabitants in 240 localities. Valle de Banderas, the municipal seat had a population of 8,730 as 2020. Other localities includes San Vicente (38,666 hab.), San José del Valle (35,486 hab.), Mezcales (24,309 hab.), Bucerías (16,161 hab.), San Juan de Abajo (11,090 hab.), San Clemente de Lima (9,561), Las Jarretaderas (9,462 hab.), El Porvenir (6,166 hab.), La Cruz de Huanacaxtle (4,169 hab.) and Sayulita (3,390 hab.) classified as urban; and Punta de Mita (2,564 hab.), Lo de Marcos (2,099 hab.) and Higuera Blanca (1,969 hab.), classified as rural..

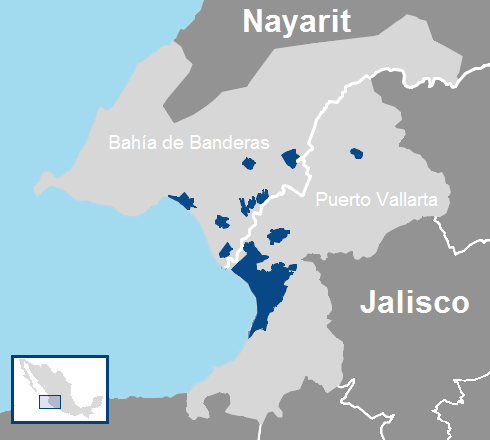
Puerto Vallarta metropolitan area

Bahía de Banderas, alongside Puerto Vallarta Municipality in the state of Jalisco (291,893 habs. as 2020) forms the interstate Puerto Vallarta Metropolitan Area. In 2020 the Metro Area had a population of 479,471 inhabitants.

== See also ==
- Ameca River — bay tributary.
- Valle de Banderas — municipal seat.
- Municipalities of Jalisco
- Municipalities of Nayarit
