= Compostela, Nayarit =

Compostela
- Municipality
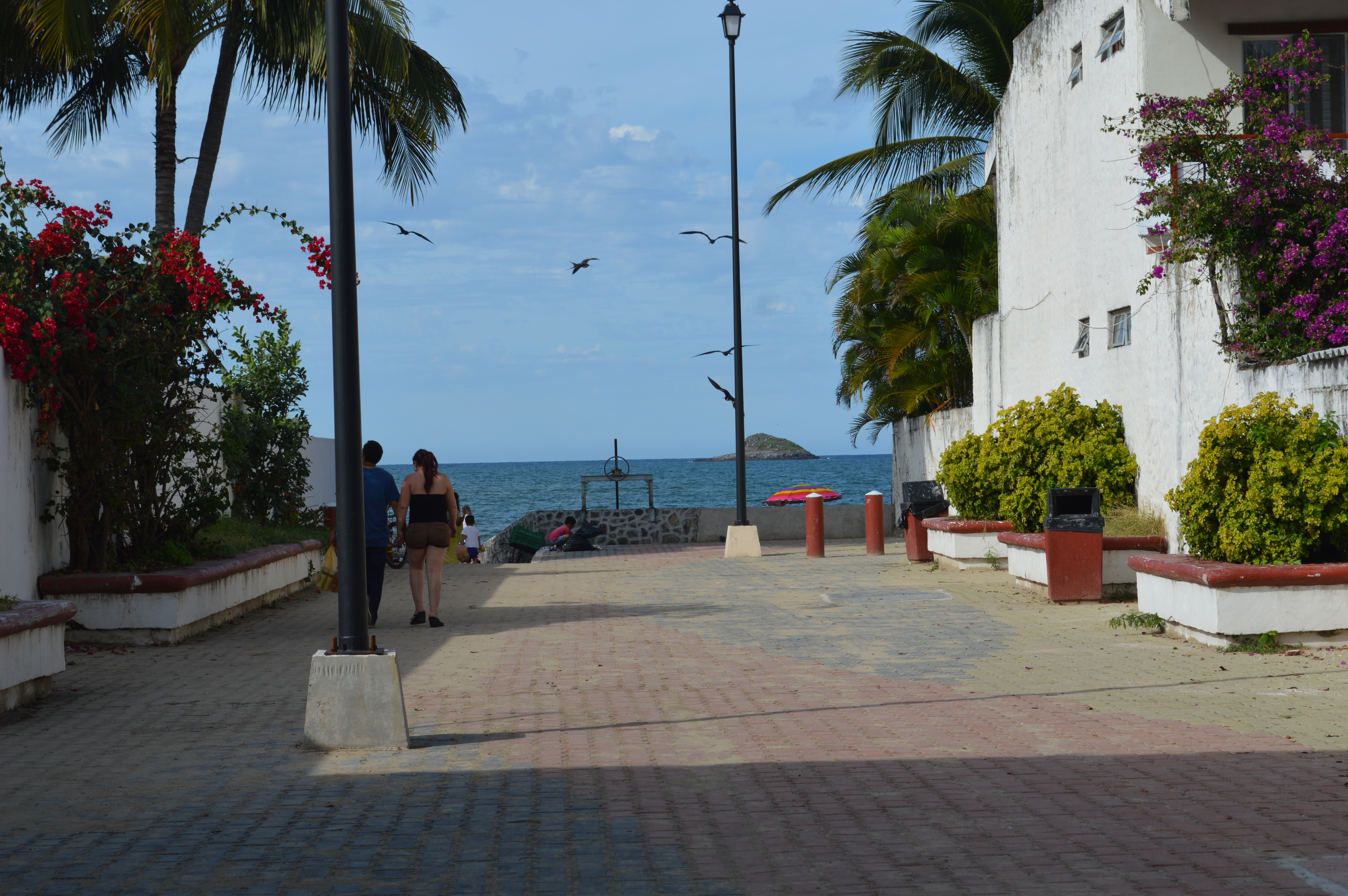
- Rincón de Guayabitos

- Coat of arms

- Location of Compostela municipality in Nayarit

- Location of Compostela in Mexico
- Coordinates: 21°14′20″N 104°54′00″W
- Country: Mexico
- State: Nayarit
- Founded: 1530
- Founder: Nuño de Guzmán
- Named for: Santiago de Compostela, Spain
- Seat: Compostela

Government
  - Presidente municipal: Romina Chang Aguilar (Morena)
  - Federal electoral district: Nayarit's 3rd

Area
  - Total: 823.6 km^{2} (318.0 sq mi)
- Highest elevation: 30 m (98 ft)

Population (2020)
  - Total: 77,436
  - Seat: 20,322
- Time zone: UTC-7 (Zona Pacífico)
- Postal Code: 63740
- Area Code: 323, 327,
- Website: compostela.nayarit.gob.mx

Compostela is the name of both a municipality and of a town in it that serves as the seat; both are in the Mexican state of Nayarit. The municipality had 77,436 in 2020 and the seat 20,322. It has a total area of 1,848 km^{2} (713.5 sq mi).

== Geography ==
Compostela is located on the south coast of the state and is bounded in the north by San Blas and Xalisco; in the south by Bahía de Banderas and the state of Jalisco; in the east by Santa María del Oro, San Pedro Lagunillas and the state of Jalisco; in the west by the Pacific Ocean.

The largest settlements in the municipality are: Compostela (15,991 inhabitants in 2000), Las Varas (12,403), La Peñita de Jaltemba (7,062), Zacualpan (4,468), and Colonia Paraíso Escondido (2,069).

The climate is tempered by elevation, with rains from July to September. The hottest months are April and May. The average annual rainfall is 968.5 mm. The average annual temperature is 22.9 °C.
