= Jasmine Bugarín =

Mexican politician

Member of the Senate of the Republic
- In office 1 September 2024 – Incumbent (on leave since 17 June 2026)
- Preceded by: Cora Cecilia Pinedo Alonso
- Constituency: Nayarit (1st seat)

Member of the Chamber of Deputies
- In office 1 September 2021 – 31 August 2024
- Preceded by: Geraldine Ponce
- Succeeded by: Beatriz Andrea Navarro Pérez
- Constituency: Nayarit's 2nd district

Member of the Chamber of Deputies
- In office 1 September 2015 – 31 August 2018
- Preceded by: Gloria Elizabeth Núñez Sánchez
- Succeeded by: Mirtha Villalvazo
- Constituency: Nayarit's 3rd district

Member of the Congress of Nayarit
- In office 1 September 2014 – 2015
- Constituency: 6th local district

Personal details
- Born: Jasmine María Bugarín Rodríguez; 27 October 1986 (age 39) Los Angeles, California, U.S.
- Party: Morena (2026–present)
- Other political affiliations: Ecologist Green Party (2019–2026); Institutional Revolutionary Party (until 2019)
- Education: Autonomous University of Nayarit
- Occupation: Politician, lawyer
- Website: jasminbugarin.com.mx

Jasmine María Bugarín Rodríguez (Note: In this Mexican name, the surname is Bugarín and the second or maternal family name is Rodríguez.) (born 27 October 1986), also known as Jasmín Bugarín, is an American-born Mexican politician and lawyer from the state of Nayarit. Currently affiliated with the Morena party, she was previously a member of the Ecologist Green Party of Mexico (PVEM) and Institutional Revolutionary Party (PRI).

From 2014 to 2015, she was a member of the Congress of Nayarit. She served in the Chamber of Deputies from 2015 to 2018 for Nayarit's 3rd district, representing the PRI, and from 2021 to 2024 for Nayarit's 2nd district, as a member of the PVEM. In the 2024 general election, she was elected to Nayarit's first seat in the Senate.

== Biography ==
=== Early life and education ===
Jasmine Bugarín was born on 27 October 1986 in Los Angeles, California, where her parents, natives of Nayarit, were migrant workers; they returned to Mexico while she was still young. She holds a law degree from the Autonomous University of Nayarit (2004–2009) and has completed diploma courses in human rights, public security and the administration of justice, and gender-based violence.

Before entering elected office, she was deputy director of the Civil Registry, a legal adviser and a human rights defender in the municipal government of La Yesca, and served as an alternate councillor (regidora suplente) of the same municipality from 2011 to 2014. From 2011 to 2013 she was the PRI's general representative in La Yesca; in 2012 she coordinated the Southern Mobile Unit of the Nayarit Women's Institute, and from 2013 to 2014 she headed the DIF liaison department at the Ministry of Social Development of the State of Nayarit.

== Political career ==
=== Member of the Congress of Nayarit (2014–2015) ===
In the 2014 Nayarit state election she was elected to the 31st Legislature of the Congress of Nayarit for the 6th local district, for a term due to run until 2018. She served on the committees for Legislative Research; Justice and Human Rights; Indigenous Affairs; Health and Social Security; Industry, Commerce and Tourism; and on the Special Grand Jury Committee. The year after her election, she resigned her seat to stand as the PRI's candidate for federal deputy for Nayarit's 3rd federal electoral district.

=== Chamber of Deputies, LXIII Legislature (2015–2018) ===
She was elected to the 63rd Congress and served from 1 September 2015 to 31 August 2018. In the Chamber of Deputies she was secretary of the committees on Youth; the Promotion of Social Programs for Older Adults; and Foreign Relations, and a member of the Tourism and Governance committees.

She took a leave of absence from 26 January to 2 July 2018 to run as the PRI's first-formula candidate for senator for Nayarit in the 2018 Senate election. She placed third in the results and so did not take a Senate seat, and returned to her seat in the Chamber of Deputies until the end of the legislature on 31 August 2018.

In 2018 she was a contender for the PRI's state presidency in Nayarit but did not win the post. In 2019 she resigned her PRI membership and joined the Ecologist Green Party of Mexico, of which she went on to become state general secretary.

=== Chamber of Deputies, LXV Legislature (2021–2024) ===
In 2021 she was nominated by the Juntos Hacemos Historia coalition for Nayarit's 2nd federal electoral district and was elected to the 65th Congress, serving from 1 September 2021 to 31 August 2024. In that legislature she sat with the PVEM's parliamentary group, served as secretary of the Committee on Climate Change and Sustainability, and was a member of the Infrastructure and Health committees.

=== Senator of the Republic (2024–present) ===
In the 2024 general election, Jasmin Bugarín Rodríguez was elected senator for the state of Nayarit by first-past-the-post as a candidate of the Sigamos Haciendo Historia coalition, made up of Morena, the PVEM, and the Labor Party (PT). She was sworn in on 29 August 2024, at the constitutive session of the 66th Congress, together with the other 128 senators-elect, and took office on 1 September.

At that same session she was elected secretary of the Senate's Bureau (Mesa Directiva) for the legislature's first year, with 127 votes in favour out of 128 senators present. She was re-elected to the same post for the legislature's second year (2025–2026).

==== Legislative activity ====
Bugarín introduced a bill to amend the law governing the Attorney General's Office to create a specialized prosecutor's office for crimes against the environment and animal abuse, presented in April 2025. In April 2026 she introduced a bill to amend the General Law on Women's Access to a Life Free of Violence and the General Health Law regarding obstetric violence. In October 2025 she proposed a comprehensive reform to the Federal Labor Law (Mexico) and the General Health Law to set limits on working hours for medical residents and create mechanisms to protect them against workplace harassment and violence.

On 29 November 2025 she presented her first legislative activity report, in which she reported having introduced more than 65 bills, points of agreement and constitutional reforms during her first year in office.

=== Leave of absence and 2027 gubernatorial bid ===
On 15 June 2026, Bugarín requested a leave of absence from the Senate, effective 17 June, to take part in the internal process through which the Morena–PVEM–PT coalition would select its candidate for governor of Nayarit in the 2027 Mexican state elections.

On 25 June 2026, the senator-on-leave formalized her registration as an aspirant for the coordination of the "Defence of the Fourth Transformation" in Nayarit, the internal process of the Morena–PVEM–PT coalition ahead of the gubernatorial election of 6 June 2027. She was confirmed in that position on 28 September.

== See also ==
- LXVI Legislature of the Mexican Congress
- Ecologist Green Party of Mexico
- Congress of Nayarit
