= Rosa Elena Jiménez Arteaga =

Mexican politician

Senator of the Congress of the Union for Nayarit
- Incumbent
- Assumed office 1 September 2018 Serving with Cora Cecilia Pinedo Alonso and Gloria Elizabeth Núñez Sánchez
- Preceded by: Miguel Ángel Navarro Quintero

Personal details
- Political party: Morena
- Occupation: Politician

Rosa Elena Jiménez Arteaga, known as Cheny Jiménez, is a Mexican politician from the National Regeneration Movement who has been a Senator from the state of Nayarit since 5 December 2021.
