= Ivideliza Reyes =

Mexican politician

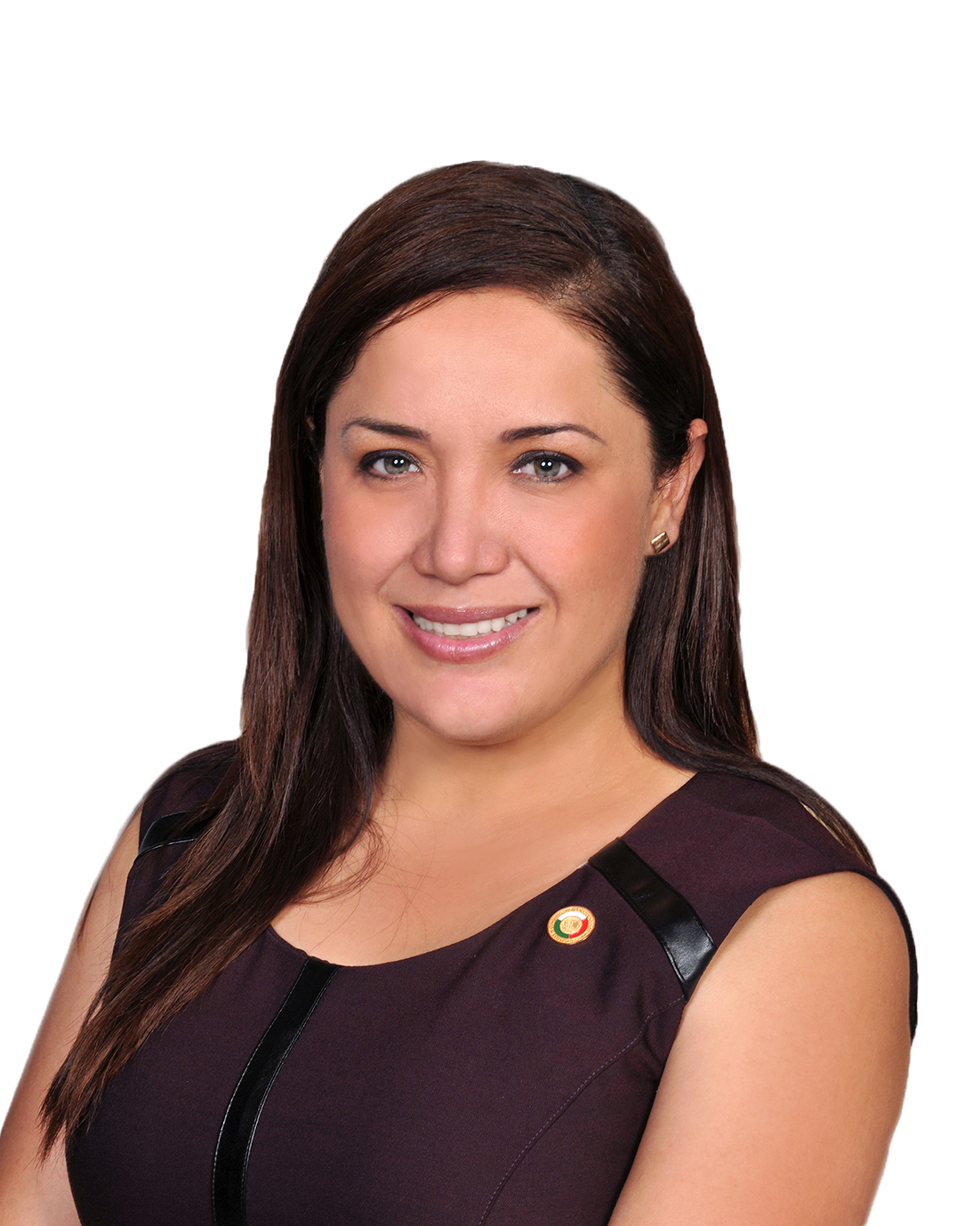
- Born: 21 December 1978 (age 47); Nayarit, Mexico
- Occupation: Politician
- Political party: PAN

Ivideliza Reyes Hernández (born 21 December 1978) is a Mexican politician from the National Action Party (PAN). She is a native of Puente de Camotlán in the municipality of La Yesca, Nayarit.

She joined the PAN in 1996 and, in 2002, earned a bachelor's degree in criminal law from the Autonomous University of Guadalajara (UAG). From 2005 to 2008, served as the municipal president of La Yesca.

From 2009 to 2012, she served as a federal deputy in the 61st Congress, representing Nayarit's third district for the PAN. In 2017 she ran as an independent in the election for municipal president of the state capital, Tepic, but lost to Francisco Javier Castellón.

She won election as Nayarit's first-minority senator in the 2024 Senate election, occupying the first place on the Fuerza y Corazón por México coalition's two-name formula, and is to serve in Congress during its 66th and 67th sessions.
