= Nuestra Belleza Nayarit 2015 =

- Presenters: TBA
- Entertainment: TBA
- Venue: Ixtlán del Río
- Broadcaster: Nayarit en Linea
- Entrants: 10
- Placements: 5
- Winner: Xalisco, Geraldine Ponce

Nuestra Belleza Nayarit 2015 was the 22nd edition of Nuestra Belleza Nayarit. This year there were 10 delatares from around the state of Nayarit competing for the state title. Geraldine Ponce from Xalisco won the title. By winning this pageant she had the opportunity to represent the state of Nayarit at the national pageant, Nuestra Belleza México 2016. She obtained the title of 2nd runner-up nationally. Later in the year the director of Nuestra Belleza México, Lupita Jones, designated her to represent Mexico in Miss International 2016 in Tokyo, Japan where she made it to the top 15.

== Results ==
=== Nuestra Belleza Nayarit 2015 ===
Pre-arrival predictions

Final results	Contestant
Nuestra Belleza Nayarit 2015	Xalisco - Geraldine Ponce
Suplente / 1st Runner-up	Tepic - Georgina Copado
2nd Runner-up	Bahía de Banderas - Perla Ruesga
3rd Runner-up	Santiago Ixcuintla - Sara Escobedo
4th Runner-up	Compostela - Dulce Sauceda
Top 10	Compostela - Xitlaly Ibañez; Tepic - Grecia Bañuelos; Tepic - Hiyari Ochoa; Tepic - Krysel Ortega; Santiago Ixcuintla - Grecia Flores

== Contestants ==
Municipality	Contestant	Age	Height	Hometown
Compostela	Dulce Sauceda	21	1.76	Compostela
Compostela	Xitlaly Ibáñez	19	1.68	La Peñita de Jaltemba
Bahía de Banderas	Perla Ruesga	22	1.75	Nuevo Vallarta
Tepic	Georgina Copado	23	1.70	Tepic
Tepic	Grecia Bañuelos	20	1.72	Tepic
Tepic	Hiyari Ochoa	23	1.75	Tepic
Tepic	Krysel Ortega	20	1.68	Tepic
Santiago Ixcuintla	Grecia Flores	22	1.72	Santiago Ixcuintla
Santiago Ixcuintla	Sara Escobedo	18	1.71	Santiago Ixcuintla
Xalisco	Geraldine Ponce	21	1.79	Pantanal
