= Nuestra Belleza Nayarit 2016 =

Mexican beauty pageant

- Date: July 15 2016
- Presenters: TBA
- Entertainment: TBA
- Venue: Compostela
- Broadcaster: Nayarit en Linea
- Entrants: 12
- Placements: 6
- Winner: Compostela, Estefanía Carrillo. Later resigned and Joselyn Preciado from Rosamorada took the title.

Nuestra Belleza Nayarit 2016 was the 23rd edition of Nuestra Belleza Nayarit. A total of 12 delegates were chosen from around the state to compete for the state title. The finale was on July 15, 2016 in the municipality of Compostela. The winner was Estefania Carrillo from Compostela. She had the privilege to represent Nayarit at the national pageant Nuestra Belleza México 2017.

One month before the national pageant, Estefanía decided to resign from the state title because of personal reasons. Joselyn Preciado, the first runner-up from Rosamorada took the title and represented Nayarit in the national pageant where she won the award of Nuestra Belleza Digital or fan favorite and was part of the top 15.

== Nuestra Belleza Nayarit 2016 ==
Pre-arrival predictions

Final results	Contestant
Nuestra Belleza Nayarit 2016	Compostela - Estefanía Carrillo Inda (Resigned); Rosamorada - Joselyn Preciado Becerra (Successor)
2nd Runner-up	Tuxpan - Alejandra Avila Aves
3rd Runner-up	Tepic - Belsy Corona
4th Runner-up	Bahía de Banderas - Edith Pelayo
5th Runner-up	Tepic - Jaqueline Peña
Top 10	Compostela - Cristina Núñez; Ixtlán del Río - Natalia Fitch Sánchez; Tepic - Alexia Dávalos; Tepic - Dafne Gutiérrez; Tepic - Kimberly Naranjo; Tepic - Lucero Hernández

== Contestants ==
Municipality	Contestant	Age	Height	Hometown
Compostela	Cristina Núñez	21	1.69	Compostela
Compostela	Estefanía Carrillo Inda	20	1.79	Mazatán
Bahía de Banderas	Edith Pelayo Monteagudo	22	1.74	Bucerias
Ixtlán del Río	Natalia Fitch Sánchez	23	1.70	Ixtlán del Río
Tepic	Alexia Dávalos	20	1.72	Tepic
Tepic	Belsy Corona	23	1.80	Tepic
Tepic	Dafne Gutiérrez	20	1.68	Tepic
Tepic	Jacqueline Peña	22	1.70	Tepic
Tepic	Kimberly Naranjo	18	1.71	Tepic
Tepic	Lucero Hernández	21	1.79	Tepic
Tuxpan	Alejandra Ávila Denis	22	1.72	Tuxpan
Rosamorada	Joselyn Preciado Becerra	18	1.80	Vicente Guerrero
