= 2nd federal electoral district of Nayarit =

Federal electoral district of Mexico

Nayarit's 2nd
- Electoral district of the Chamber of Deputies of Mexico

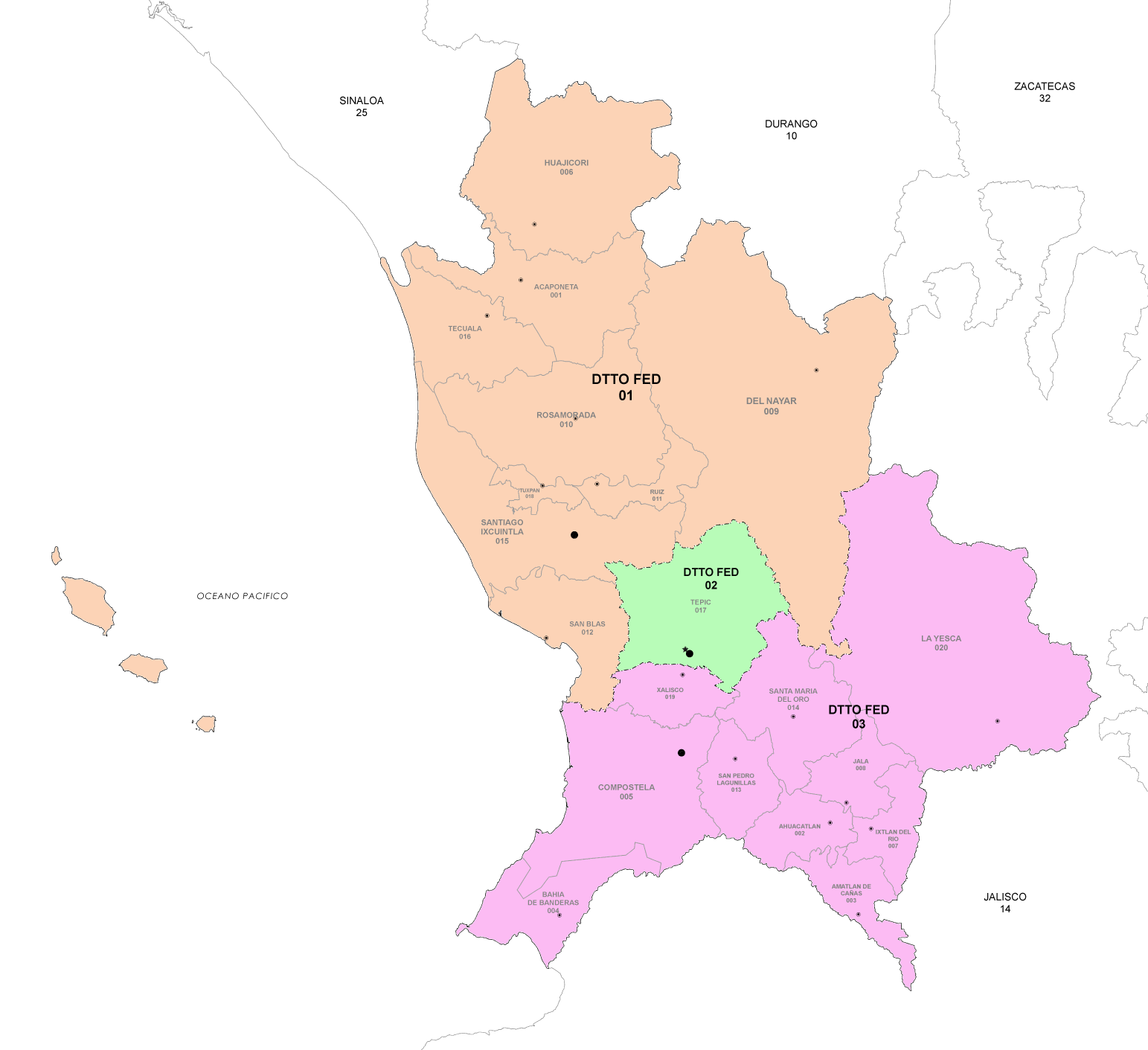
- 2nd district since 2005

Incumbent
- Member: Beatriz Andrea Navarro Pérez
- Party: ▌Morena
- Congress: 66th (2024–2027)

District
- State: Nayarit
- Head town: Tepic
- Coordinates: 21°30′N 104°53′W
- Covers: Municipality of Tepic
- PR region: First
- Precincts: 300
- Population: 423,641 (2020 census)

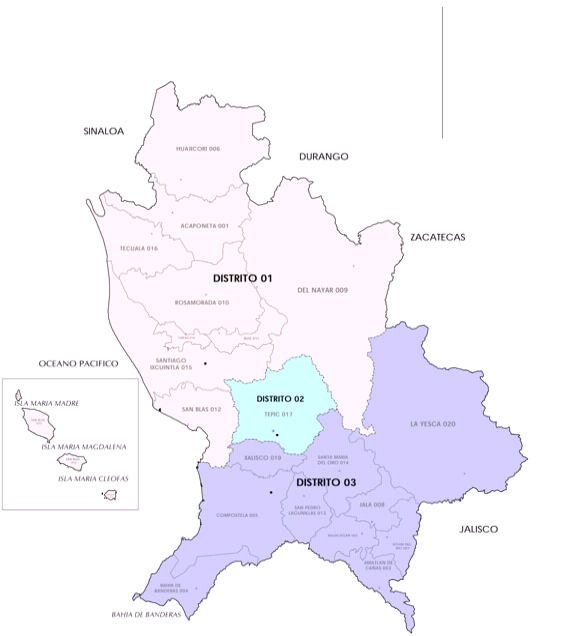
Nayarit under the 2017–2022 districting plan

The 2nd federal electoral district of Nayarit (Spanish: Distrito electoral federal 02 de Nayarit) is one of the 300 electoral districts into which Mexico is divided for elections to the federal Chamber of Deputies and one of three such districts in the state of Nayarit.

It elects one deputy to the lower house of Congress for each three-year legislative session by means of the first-past-the-post system. Votes cast in the district also count towards the calculation of proportional representation ("plurinominal") deputies elected from the first region.

The current member for the district, elected in the 2024 general election, is Beatriz Andrea Navarro Pérez of the National Regeneration Movement (Morena).

== District territory ==
Under the 2023 districting plan adopted by the National Electoral Institute (INE), which is to be used for the 2024, 2027 and 2030 federal elections, Nayarit's 2nd district comprises the 300 precincts (secciones electorales) that make up the municipality of Tepic in the centre of the state.

The head town (cabecera distrital), where results from individual polling stations are gathered together and tallied, is the state capital, the city of Tepic. The district reported a population of 423,641 in the 2020 census.

== Previous districting schemes ==
Evolution of electoral district numbers
	1974	1978	1996	2005	2017	2023
Nayarit	2	3	3	3	3	3
Chamber of Deputies	196	300				

2017–2022

Between 2017 and 2022, as in the 2023 plan, the district comprised the municipality of Tepic, with the state capital serving as the head town.

2005–2017

In 2005–2017 the district covered the municipality of Tepic. The head town was the city of Tepic.

1996–2005

Between 1996 and 2005, the district covered the municipality of Tepic, plus the municipalities of El Nayar and La Yesca. The head town was Tepic.

1978–1996

The districting scheme in force from 1978 to 1996 was the result of the 1977 electoral reforms, which increased the number of single-member seats in the Chamber of Deputies from 196 to 300. Under that plan, Nayarit's seat allocation rose from two to three. The 2nd district was in the north of the state and had its head town at Santiago Ixcuintla.

== Deputies returned to Congress ==
(Mexico) National parties
- Current
- PAN
- PRI
- PT
- PVEM
- MC
- Morena
- PAZ
- Somos
- Defunct or local only
- PLM
- PNR
- PRM
- PNM
- PP
- PPS
- PARM
- PFCRN
- CON
- PANAL
- PSD
- PES
- PES
- PRD

Nayarit's 2nd district
Election	Deputy	Party	Term	Legislature
1916	Marcelino Cedano		1916–1917	Constituent Congress of Querétaro
1917	José R. Padilla		1917–1918	27th Congress
1918	Lucas Bravo		1918–1920	28th Congress
1920	Lucas Bravo		1920–1922	29th Congress
1922	Ismael Romero Gallardo		1922–1924	30th Congress
1924	Ismael Romero Gallardo		1924–1926	31st Congress
1926	Ismael Romero Gallardo		1926–1928	32nd Congress
1928	Antíoco Rodríguez		1928–1930	33rd Congress
1930	Gregorio Díaz	Institutional Revolutionary Party	1930–1932	34th Congress
1932	Marcos Jiménez	Institutional Revolutionary Party	1932–1934	35th Congress
1934	José Alejandro Anaya	Institutional Revolutionary Party	1934–1937	36th Congress
1937	José Angulo Araico	Institutional Revolutionary Party	1937–1940	37th Congress
1940	Emilio M. González		1940–1943	38th Congress
1943	Gabriel Castañeda Landazuri	Institutional Revolutionary Party	1943–1946	39th Congress
1946	Ángel Meza López	Institutional Revolutionary Party	1946–1949	40th Congress
1949	Emilio M. González	Institutional Revolutionary Party	1949–1951	41st Congress
1952	Bernardo M. de León	Institutional Revolutionary Party	1952–1955	42nd Congress
1955	Manuel Villegas Arellano	Institutional Revolutionary Party	1955–1958	43rd Congress
1958	Pedro Luna Mercado	Institutional Revolutionary Party	1958–1961	44th Congress
1961	Leopoldo T. García Estévez	Institutional Revolutionary Party	1961–1964	45th Congress
1964	Marina Núñez Guzmán	Institutional Revolutionary Party	1964–1967	46th Congress
1967	Emilio M. González	Institutional Revolutionary Party	1967–1970	47th Congress
1970	Celso Humberto Delgado	Institutional Revolutionary Party	1970–1973	48th Congress
1973	Anselmo Ibarra Beas	Institutional Revolutionary Party	1970–1973	49th Congress
1976	María Hilaria Domínguez Arvizu	Institutional Revolutionary Party	1976–1979	50th Congress
1979	Emilio M. González	Institutional Revolutionary Party	1979–1982	51st Congress
1982	Ignacio González Barragán	Institutional Revolutionary Party	1982–1985	52nd Congress
1985	Leobardo Ramos Martínez	Institutional Revolutionary Party	1985–1988	53rd Congress
1988	Ignacio González Barragán	Institutional Revolutionary Party	1988–1991	54th Congress
1991	Víctor Joaquín Canovas Moreno	Institutional Revolutionary Party	1991–1994	55th Congress
1994	José Santos Ramos Damián	Institutional Revolutionary Party	1994–1997	56th Congress
1997	Salvador Sánchez Vázquez	Institutional Revolutionary Party	1997–2000	57th Congress
2000	Ney González Sánchez; Luis Eduardo Jiménez Agraz	Institutional Revolutionary Party	2000–2002; 2002–2003	58th Congress
2003	Gerardo Montenegro Ibarra	Institutional Revolutionary Party	2003–2006	59th Congress
2006	María Eugenia Jiménez Valenzuela	Party of the Democratic Revolution	2006–2009	60th Congress
2009	Martha Elena García Gómez	Party of the Democratic Revolution	2009–2012	61st Congress
2012	Roy Gómez Olguín; Ángel Alain Aldrete Lamas	Institutional Revolutionary Party	2012–2014; 2014–2015	62nd Congress
2015	Gianni Raúl Ramírez Ocampo; Fidel Cristóbal Serrato (Note: Belonged to the PVEM for a period of two weeks in Aug/Sep 2017.)	Institutional Revolutionary Party Ecologist Green Party of Mexico	2015–2018	63rd Congress
2018	Geraldine Ponce Méndez	National Regeneration Movement	2018–2021	64th Congress
2021	Jasmine Bugarín Rodríguez	National Regeneration Movement	2021–2024	65th Congress
2024	Beatriz Andrea Navarro Pérez	National Regeneration Movement	2024–2027	66th Congress

== Presidential elections ==
Nayarit's 2nd district
Election	District won by	Party or coalition	%
2018	Andrés Manuel López Obrador	Juntos Haremos Historia	69.8455
2024	Claudia Sheinbaum Pardo	Sigamos Haciendo Historia	57.4751
