= Gerardo Montenegro Ibarra =

Mexican politician (born 1966)

- Born: 10 January 1966 (age 60); Ixtlán del Río, Nayarit, Mexico
- Occupation: Politician
- Political party: PRI

Gerardo Montenegro Ibarra (born 10 January 1966) is a Mexican politician affiliated with the Institutional Revolutionary Party (PRI).

In 2006–2012 he was a senator for Nayarit during the 60th and 61st Congresses. He also served as a federal deputy in the 59th Congress, representing the second district of Nayarit and a local deputy in the Congress of Nayarit.
