= Miguel Ángel Navarro Quintero =

Mexican physician and politician

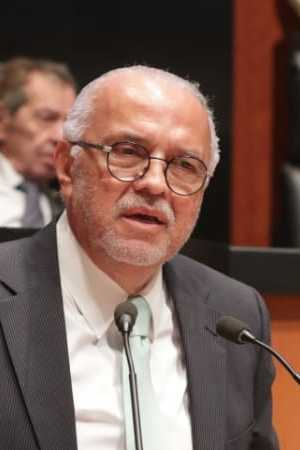
- Navarro In 2019

Governor of Nayarit
- Incumbent
- Assumed office 19 September 2021
- Preceded by: Antonio Echevarría García

Senator for Nayarit
- In office 1 September 2018 – 31 August 2021 Serving with C. Pinedo and G. Núñez
- Preceded by: Manuel Cota Jiménez

Personal details
- Born: 11 January 1951 (age 75) Tepic, Nayarit, Mexico
- Party: MORENA (2014-present)
- Other political affiliations: PRD (2005-2012); PRI (1975-2005)
- Education: IPN
- Occupation: Physician

Miguel Ángel Navarro Quintero (born 11 January 1951) is a Mexican physician and politician affiliated with the National Regeneration Movement (Morena). He served in the Senate for the state of Nayarit from 2018 to 2020, his second term as senator from after being elected in the 2000 general election for the 2000–2006 term. He was also a federal deputy in the 57th (1997–2000) and 60th (2006–2009) sessions of Congress and ran two times, unsuccessfully, as a gubernatorial candidate in Nayarit. After winning the election in 2021, he is the current governor of Nayarit.

== Life ==
Navarro attended the School of Medicine of the Instituto Politécnico Nacional and graduated in 1976 as a surgeon. That same year, he joined the Institutional Revolutionary Party (PRI) and the National Confederation of Popular Organizations (CNOP).

As a doctor, Navarro obtained his specialty in obstetrics and gynecology in 1980, rising through the ranks of the ISSSTE hospital system. Between 1981 and 1986, he was the director of the Aquiles Calles Ramírez General Hospital in Tepic, which is part of the ISSSTE system. Additionally, he was a professor at the Universidad Autónoma de Nayarit between 1982 and 1996, heading the Joaquín Herrera School of Nursing. Between 1986 and 1989, he represented the ISSSTE in Tepic, and he entered the state government proper in 1989, first as a director of medical services and finally, between 1996 and 1997, as the state secretariat of health.

=== First legislative stint ===
In the 1997 federal election, Navarro was elected to the Chamber of Deputies for the first time, for Nayarit's third district, beginning an uninterrupted twelve-year run in Congress. In the 57th Congress, as a federal deputy, he sat on four commissions; additionally, he unsuccessfully ran to be the mayor of Tepic. Three years later, he became a senator, sitting on six commissions during his six-year term.

In March 2005, Navarro competed with Ney González Sánchez to obtain the PRI gubernatorial nomination in Nayarit. After a contested internal election won by González, Navarro claimed fraud and left the PRI. He immediately joined the Party of the Democratic Revolution (PRD) and ran as its coalition candidate, but lost to González Sánchez.

In 2006, Navarro returned to the Chamber of Deputies, as a plurinominal deputy for the first region; during his term, he presided over the Social Security Commission. He ran again, unsuccessfully, for mayor of Tepic in 2008. After his term ended in the Chamber of Deputies, he became a National Action Party (PAN) member and was named as the delegate of the Instituto Mexicano del Seguro Social (IMSS) to Chiapas; three years later, he left the party and became an advisor to that state's governor, Manuel Velasco Coello.

=== Switch to Morena and re-election to the Senate ===
In July 2016, during a visit by Andrés Manuel López Obrador to Tepic, he named Navarro "promoter of national sovereignty in Nayarit", serving as the beginning of his career in Morena and signaling that he would be the party's gubernatorial candidate in Nayarit in 2017. Navarro Quintero finished a distant third, with 12 percent of the vote. He won re-election to the Senate in 2018, however, when he was one of two candidates on the Juntos Haremos Historia coalition ticket.

He was elected governor of Nayarit in June 2021.
