= 3rd federal electoral district of Nayarit =

Federal electoral district of Mexico

Nayarit's 3rd
- Electoral district of the Chamber of Deputies of Mexico

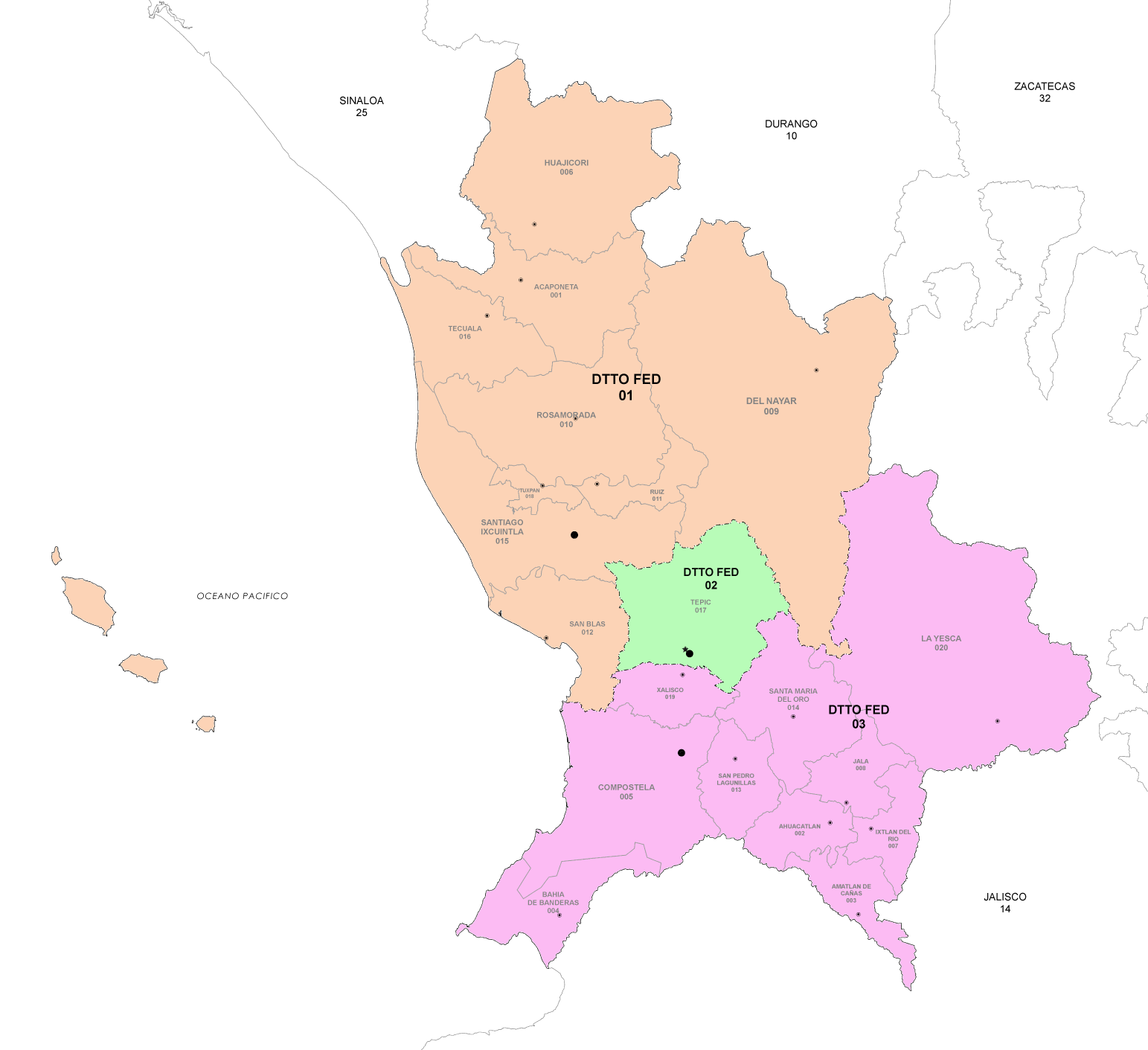
- 3rd district since 2017

Incumbent
- Member: Jorge Armando Ortiz Rodríguez
- Party: ▌Morena
- Congress: 66th (2024–2027)

District
- State: Nayarit
- Head town: Compostela
- Coordinates: 21°14′N 104°54′W
- Covers: Ahuacatlán, Amatlán de Cañas, Bahía de Banderas, Compostela, Ixtlán del Río, Jala, San Pedro Lagunillas, Santa María del Oro, Xalisco, La Yesca
- PR region: First
- Precincts: 269
- Population: 454,432 (2020 census)

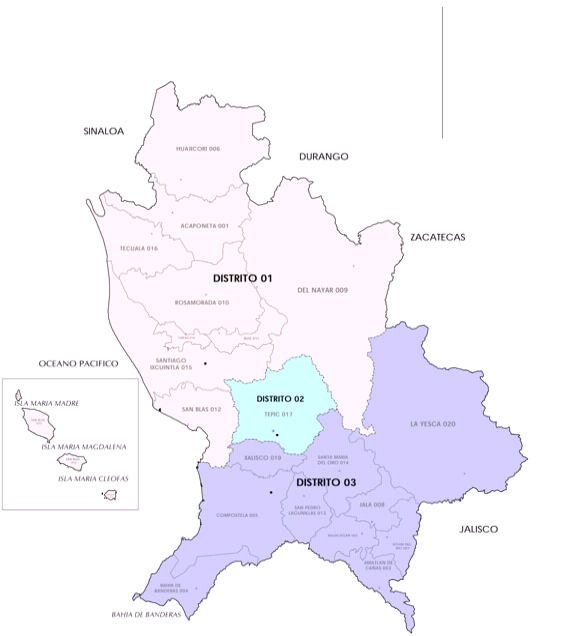
Nayarit under the 2017–2022 districting plan

The 3rd federal electoral district of Nayarit (Spanish: Distrito electoral federal 03 de Nayarit) is one of the 300 electoral districts into which Mexico is divided for elections to the federal Chamber of Deputies and one of three such districts in the state of Nayarit.

It elects one deputy to the lower house of Congress for each three-year legislative session by means of the first-past-the-post system. Votes cast in the district also count towards the calculation of proportional representation ("plurinominal") deputies elected from the first region.

Suspended in 1930, (Note: An amendment to Article 52 of the Constitution in 1928 changed the original provision of "one deputy per 60,000 inhabitants" to "one deputy per 100,000"; as a result, the size of the Chamber of Deputies fell from 281 in the 1928 election to 171 in 1934.) the 3rd district was restored as part of the 1977 political reforms and was contended again in the 1979 election; between 1930 and 1979, Nayarit comprised only two federal electoral districts.

The current member for the district, re-elected in the 2024 general election, is Jorge Armando Ortiz Rodríguez of the Labour Party (PT).

== District territory ==
Under the 2023 districting plan adopted by the National Electoral Institute (INE), which is to be used for the 2024, 2027 and 2030 federal elections, the 3rd district covers 269 precincts (secciones electorales) across the state's ten southern municipalities:

- Ahuacatlán, Amatlán de Cañas, Bahía de Banderas, Compostela, Ixtlán del Río, Jala, San Pedro Lagunillas, Santa María del Oro, Xalisco and La Yesca.

The head town (cabecera distrital), where results from individual polling stations are gathered together and tallied, is the city of Compostela. The district reported a population of 454,432 in the 2020 census.

== Previous districting schemes ==
Evolution of electoral district numbers
	1974	1978	1996	2005	2017	2023
Nayarit	2	3	3	3	3	3
Chamber of Deputies	196	300				

2017–2022

Between 2017 and 2022, the 3rd district had the same composition as in the 2023 plan.

2005–2017

Between 2005 and 2017 the district was located in the south of the state. It had the same composition as in the 2023 plan, with the addition of the municipality of San Blas. The head town was at Compostela.

1996–2005

Between 1996 and 2005 the district had the same composition as in 2005–2017, with the exception of the municipality of La Yesca, which belonged to the 2nd district.

1978–1996

The districting scheme in force from 1978 to 1996 was the result of the 1977 electoral reforms, which increased the number of single-member seats in the Chamber of Deputies from 196 to 300. Under that plan, Nayarit's seat allocation rose from two to three. The restored 3rd district had its head town at Compostela and it comprised ten of the state's municipalities.

== Deputies returned to Congress ==
(Mexico) National parties
- Current
- PAN
- PRI
- PT
- PVEM
- MC
- Morena
- PAZ
- Somos
- Defunct or local only
- PLM
- PNR
- PRM
- PNM
- PP
- PPS
- PARM
- PFCRN
- CON
- PANAL
- PSD
- PES
- PES
- PRD

Nayarit's 3rd district
Election	Deputy	Party	Term	Legislature
1916	Juan Espinosa Bávara		1916–1917	Constituent Congress of Querétaro
1917	José Ahumada		1917–1918	27th Congress
1918	Juan Espinosa Bávara		1918–1920	28th Congress
1920	Ricardo A. Álvarez		1920–1922	29th Congress
1922	Apolonio R. Guzmán		1922–1924	30th Congress
1924	José de la Peña		1924–1926	31st Congress
1926	Pedro López S.		1926–1928	32nd Congress
1928	Enrique Espinoza		1928–1930	33rd Congress
The 3rd district was suspended between 1930 and 1979
1979	Carlos Serafín Ramírez	Institutional Revolutionary Party	1979–1982	51st Congress
1982	Juan Medina Cervantes	Institutional Revolutionary Party	1982–1985	52nd Congress
1985	Enrique Medina Lomelí	Institutional Revolutionary Party	1985–1988	53rd Congress
1988	Olga López Castillo; Rafael Mascorro Toro	Institutional Revolutionary Party	1988–1991	54th Congress
1991	José Ramón Navarro Quintero	Institutional Revolutionary Party	1991–1994	55th Congress
1994	Liberato Montenegro Villa	Institutional Revolutionary Party	1994–1997	56th Congress
1997	Miguel Ángel Navarro Quintero	Institutional Revolutionary Party	1997–2000	57th Congress
2000	José Manuel Quintanilla Rentería	Institutional Revolutionary Party	2000–2003	58th Congress
2003	Raúl Mejía González	Institutional Revolutionary Party	2003–2006	59th Congress
2006	Sergio Sandoval Paredes	Institutional Revolutionary Party	2006–2009	60th Congress
2009	Ivideliza Reyes Hernández	National Action Party (Mexico)	2009–2012	61st Congress
2012	Gloria Elizabeth Núñez Sánchez	Institutional Revolutionary Party	2012–2015	62nd Congress
2015	Jasmine María Bugarín Rodríguez	Institutional Revolutionary Party	2015–2018	63rd Congress
2018	Mirtha Iliana Villalvazo Amaya	National Regeneration Movement	2018–2021	64th Congress
2021	Jorge Armando Ortiz Rodríguez	Labour Party (Mexico)	2021–2024	65th Congress
2024	Jorge Armando Ortiz Rodríguez	Labour Party (Mexico)	2024–2027	66th Congress

== Presidential elections ==
Nayarit's 3rd district
Election	District won by	Party or coalition	%
2018	Andrés Manuel López Obrador	Juntos Haremos Historia	63.7251
2024	Claudia Sheinbaum Pardo	Sigamos Haciendo Historia	64.0309
