= Sergio Sandoval Paredes =

Mexican politician

- Born: 2 November 1960 (age 65); Santa María del Oro, Nayarit, Mexico
- Occupation: Politician
- Political party: PRI

Sergio Sandoval Paredes (born 2 November 1960) is a Mexican politician affiliated with the Institutional Revolutionary Party (PRI). In 2006–2009 he served as a federal deputy in 60th Congress, representing Nayarit's third district.
