= Raúl José Mejía González =

Mexican politician (born 1954)

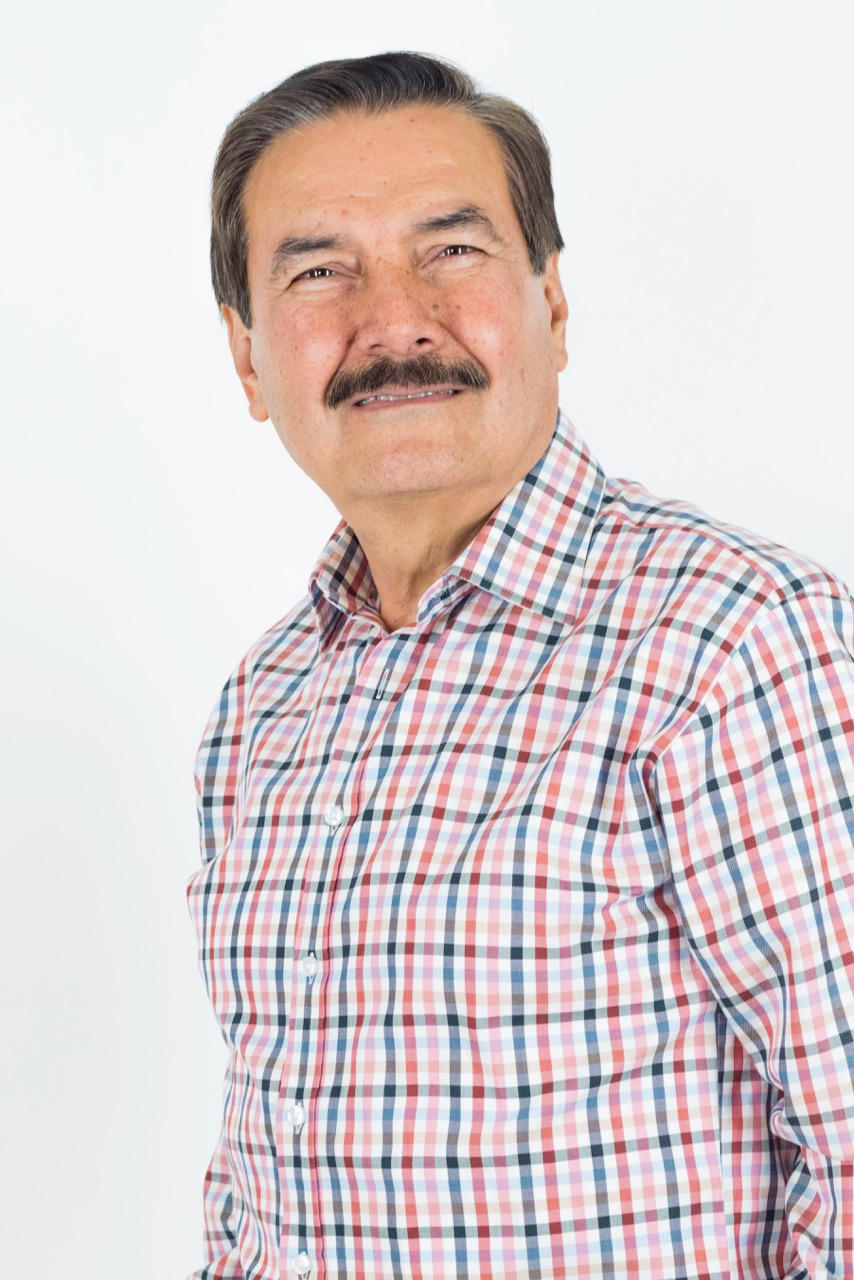
- Portrait of Raúl José Mejía González
- Born: 4 April 1954 (age 72); Tepic, Nayarit, Mexico
- Education: University of Guadalajara
- Occupations: Deputy and Senator
- Political party: PRI

Raúl José Mejía González (born 4 April 1954) is a Mexican politician affiliated with the Institutional Revolutionary Party (PRI).

In 2006–2012 he served as a senator for Nayarit during the 60th and 61st sessions of Congress. He also served as a federal deputy in the 59th Congress, representing Nayarit's third district and, in 1993–1996, he was the municipal president of Tepic.

Preceded by Alejandro Rivas Curiel	Municipal President of Tepic; 1993–1996	Succeeded by José Félix Torres Haro
