= Geraldine Ponce =

Mexican politician (born 1994)

Mayor of Tepic
- Incumbent
- Assumed office 17 September 2021
- Preceded by: Francisco Javier Castellón

Member of the Chamber of Deputies
- In office 1 September 2018 – 31 August 2021
- Preceded by: Fidel Cristóbal Serrato
- Succeeded by: Jasmin Bugarin
- Constituency: Nayarit's 2nd

Personal details
- Born: 4 April 1994 (age 32)
- Party: Morena (since 2017)

María Geraldine Ponce Méndez (born 4 April 1994) is a Mexican politician serving as mayor of Tepic, Nayarit, since 2021. From 2018 to 2021, she was a member of the Chamber of Deputies, representing Nayarit's 2nd district. In 2015, she won the Nuestra Belleza Nayarit beauty contest. In 2016, she represented Mexico at Miss International.
