= San Pedro Lagunillas =

Coordinates: 21°13′N 104°46′W

- Municipality
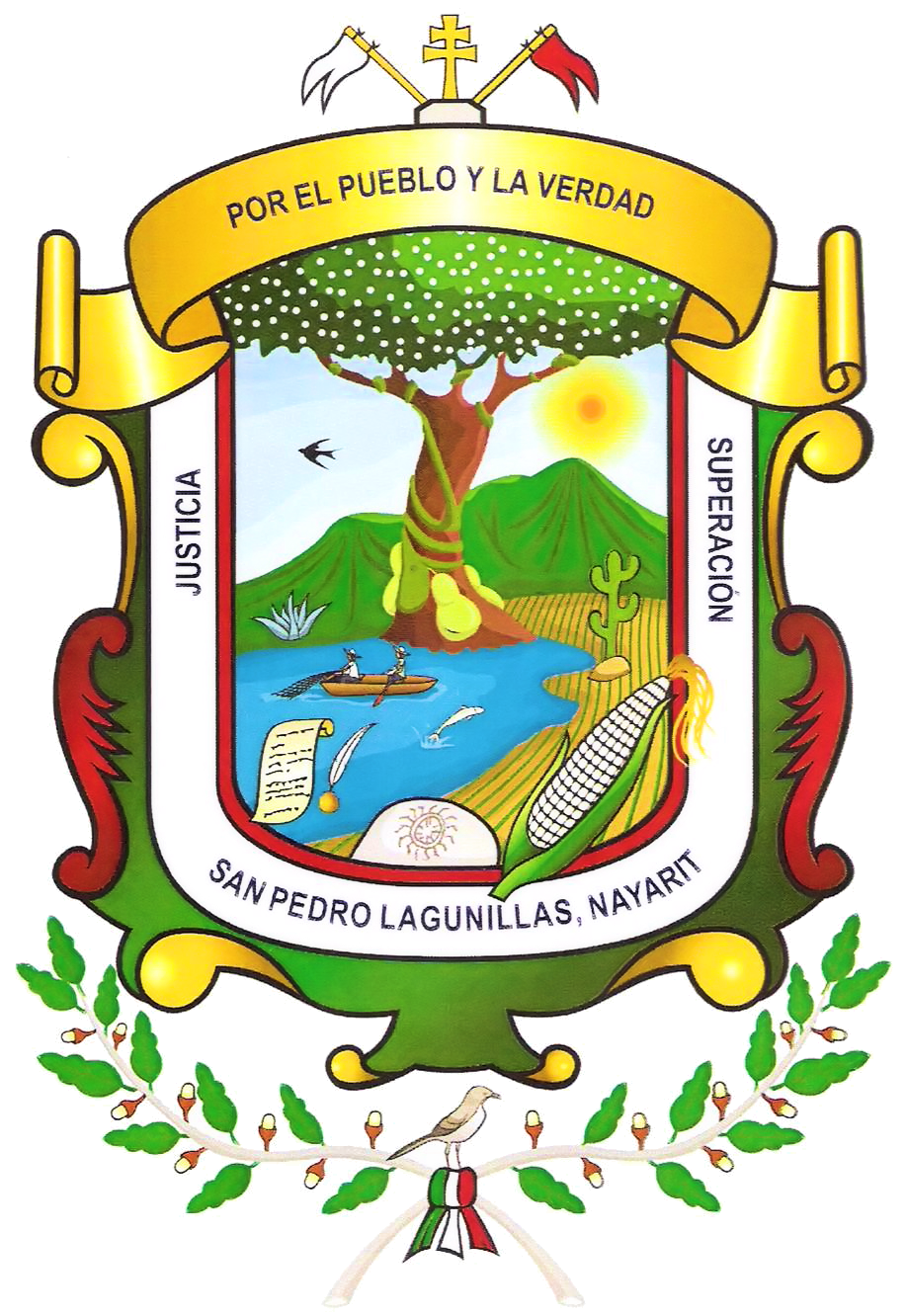
- Coat of arms

- Location in Mexico San Pedro Lagunillas (Mexico)
- Country: Mexico
- State: Nayarit

Government
  - Federal electoral district: Nayarit's 3rd
- Demonym: (in Spanish)
- Time zone: UTC−7 (Zona Pacífico)

San Pedro Lagunillas is both a municipality and the municipal seat of the same in the Mexican state of Nayarit, being the least populous municipality in Nayarit. The population of the municipality was 7,155 (2005) in a total area of 520 square kilometers. The population of the town and municipal seat was 3,630 (2005). The population has been declining since 1980 when it was 8,308 inhabitants.

The municipality of San Pedro Lagunillas is located at the following extreme coordinates: from parallel 20° 59’ to 21° 20’ latitude north and from meridian 104° 37’ to 104° 54’ longitude west. It is located in the south of the state of Nayarit and is bounded in the north and east by the municipality of Santa María del Oro, in the south by the municipality of Ahuacatlán and the state of Jalisco, and in the west by the municipality of Compostela.

The pre-Hispanic name was "Ximochoque", which means "Place of bitter jars". With the arrival of the Spanish the place was rebaptized with the name of San Pedro Lagunillas to honor the first Count of Miravalle, Pedro Alonso Dávalos Bracamonte y Uibarri, who provided the resources for the construction of the church and in reference to the lakes of clear water found in the region.

Most of the municipality belongs to a volcanic zone. The main elevations are "Cerro Grande"(2,000 meters), "Cerro Tetillas" (1,760 meters), "Cerro La Palma" (1,740 meters), "Cerro Estiladero" (1,600 meters), "Cerro El Carretón" (1,580 meters), and the extinct volcano of "Tepetiltic" (1,500 meters).

The economy is mainly agricultural with the main crops being corn, beans, and sugarcane. There is some cattle raising with 34,214 head counted in the 1990 census.

Due to the seasonal nature of the agriculture there has been intensive emigration in the last twenty years, especially to the United States of America.

The main tourist sights are the two lakes of San Pedro and Tepetiltic. There is also a small museum in the town with displays of pre-Columbian artifacts.
