= Héctor González Curiel =

Mexican politician

Héctor González Curiel (born 1968 in Tepic, Nayarit) is a Mexican engineer, politician and member of the Institutional Revolutionary Party.

Curiel entered politics in 1989 in the Department of Planning and Development, in charge of Nayarit's drinking water and sewage programme. For thirteen years, he served as head of SIAPA, Tepic.

Between 2011 and 2014, Curiel served as Municipal President of Tepic.
