= Antonio Echevarría García =

Mexican businessman and politician

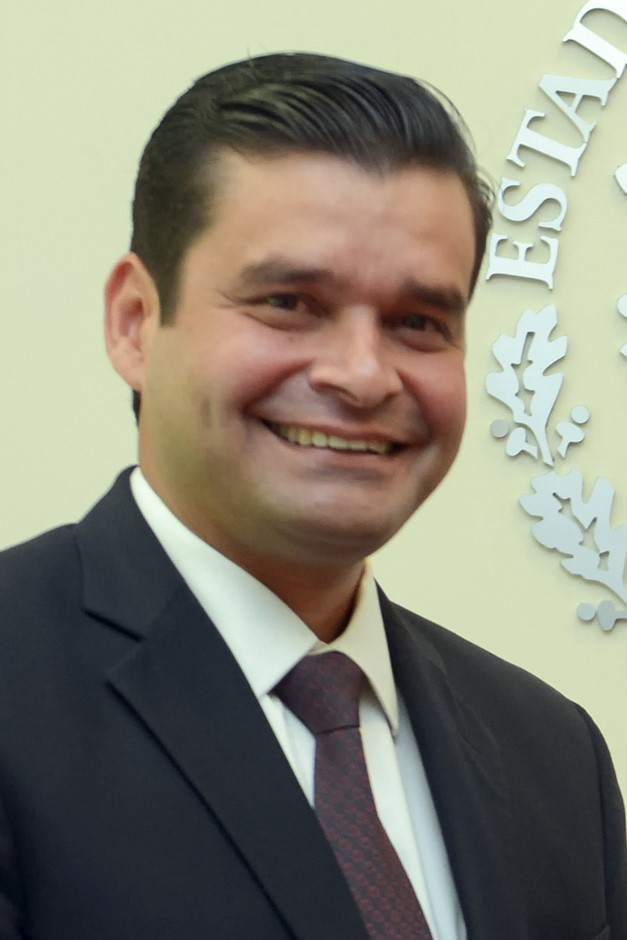

Governor of Nayarit
- In office 19 September 2017 – 18 September 2021
- Preceded by: Roberto Sandoval Castañeda
- Succeeded by: Miguel Ángel Navarro Quintero

Personal details
- Born: 22 April 1974 (age 52) Tepic, Nayarit, Mexico
- Party: National Action Party
- Education: Autonomous University of Guadalajara (BBA)

Antonio Echevarría García is a Mexican businessman and politician who served as Governor of Nayarit from 2017 to 2021, and is affiliated with the National Action Party.

== Life ==
Echevarría García, an accountant and alumnus of the Universidad Autónoma de Guadalajara, has been involved in business since the age of 17. He became the director general of Grupo Álica, a diversified conglomerate with holdings in media, real estate, soft drinks, and car dealerships, in 2013.

In 2017, Echevarría announced he would run for governor, following the footsteps of his father, Antonio Echevarría Domínguez, who governed the state between 1999 and 2005, and was Nayarit's first non-PRI governor, and his mother, Martha Elena García Gómez, who is a senator for Nayarit, and also ran as the PAN-PRD gubernatorial candidate in 2011. The candidacy was supported by the Juntos por Ti (Together for You) coalition, comprising the PAN, PRD, Labor Party, and one state party, the Party of the Socialist Revolution.

On election day, Echevarría, who had never before held public office, beat PRI candidate Manuel Cota Jiménez by more than 11 percentage points, according to early counts; he secured 38 percent of the vote.

Antonio Echevarría tested positive for COVID-19 on January 30, 2021.
