= Ceboruco =

Volcano in central western Mexico

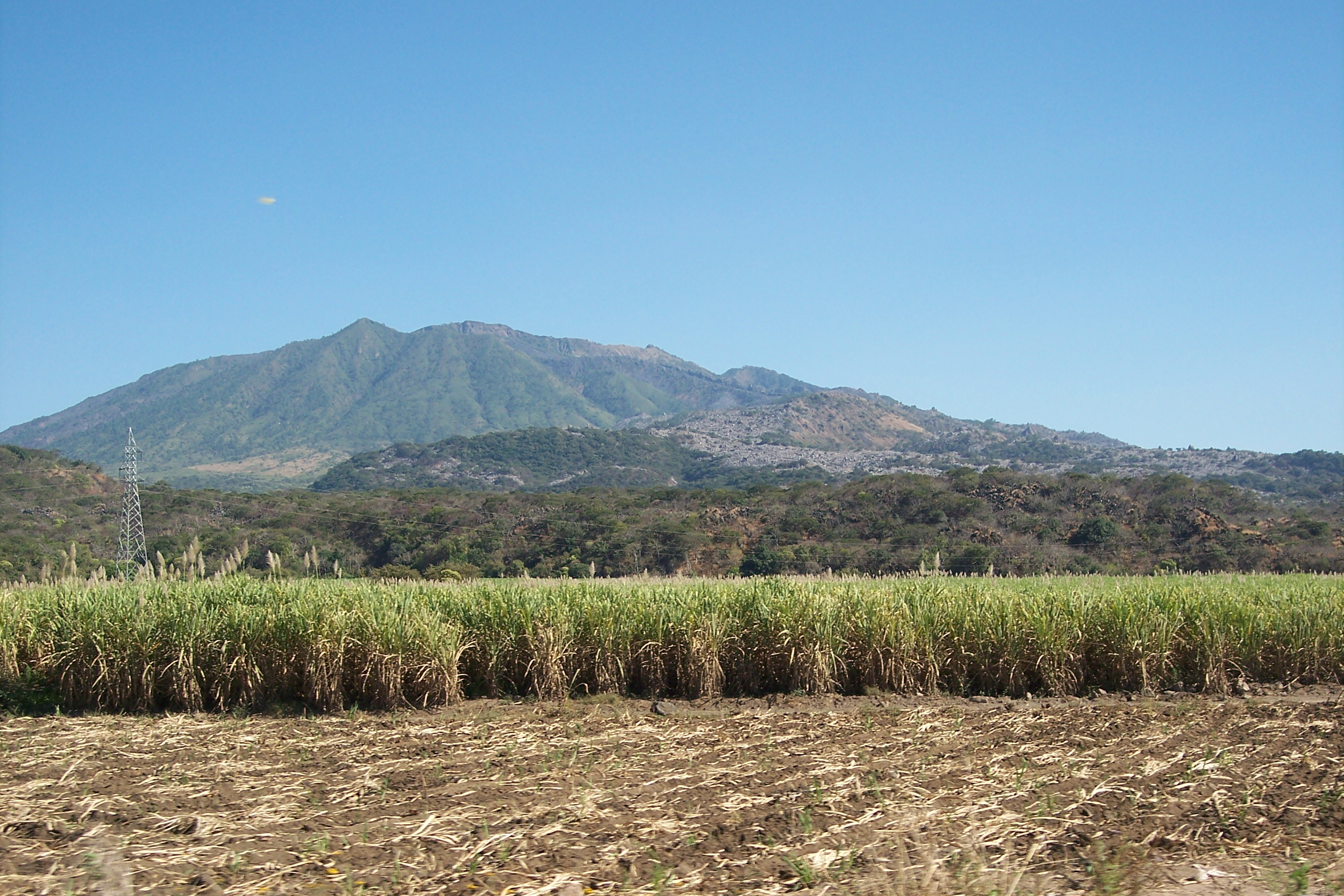
- Ceboruco volcano

Highest point
- Elevation: 2,280 m (7,480 ft)
- Listing: List of volcanoes in Mexico
- Coordinates: 21°7′30″N 104°30′30″W

Geography
- Location within Nayarit Location within Mexico
- Location: Jala Municipality, Nayarit, Mexico
- Country: Mexico
- State: Nayarit
- Municipality: Jala

Geology
- Mountain type: Stratovolcano
- Volcanic belt: Trans-Mexican Volcanic Belt
- Last eruption: 1870-75

Ceboruco is a dacitic stratovolcano located in Nayarit, Mexico, northwest of the Trans-Mexican Volcanic Belt. The largest eruption, the Jala Plinian eruption, was around 930 AD ±200, VEI 6, releasing 11 cubic kilometres (2.6 cu mi) of tephra. The most recent and best documented eruption from Ceboruco lasted from 1870–1875, with fumarole activity lasting well into the 20th century. The mountain features one large caldera, created during the Jala eruption, with a smaller crater nested inside that formed when the Dos Equis lava dome collapsed during the Coapales eruption around 1100 AD. Within both of these craters, are several explosive volcanic features, including scoria deposits, lava domes, and pyroclastic domes, or cinder cone volcanoes.

Cooled lava flows preserved around the volcano keep a record of the recent eruptions. Before the Jala eruption, there is record of one major lava flow, called the Destiladero flow. During the 500 years after the Jala eruption, the volcano was at its most active, leaving record of six major lava flows: the Copales, El Cajón, Coapan I, Coapan II, El Norte, and Ceboruco flows, all before the Spanish arrived in 1521. The volcano remained active until the next major eruption in 1870, however volcanism was, for the most part, constrained within the calderas.

Lava extruded from the volcano is primarily trachydacite to trachyandesite in composition, transitioning from more andesitic to more dacitic compositions over time. The magma is likely a mix from three different sources, a rhyodacite source, a dacite source (likely itself a mixture of rhyodacite and basalt), and a mafic source.

The Ceboruco in a lithograph by José María Velasco, La Naturaleza, 1870
