= Ney González Sánchez =

Mexican politician (born 1963)

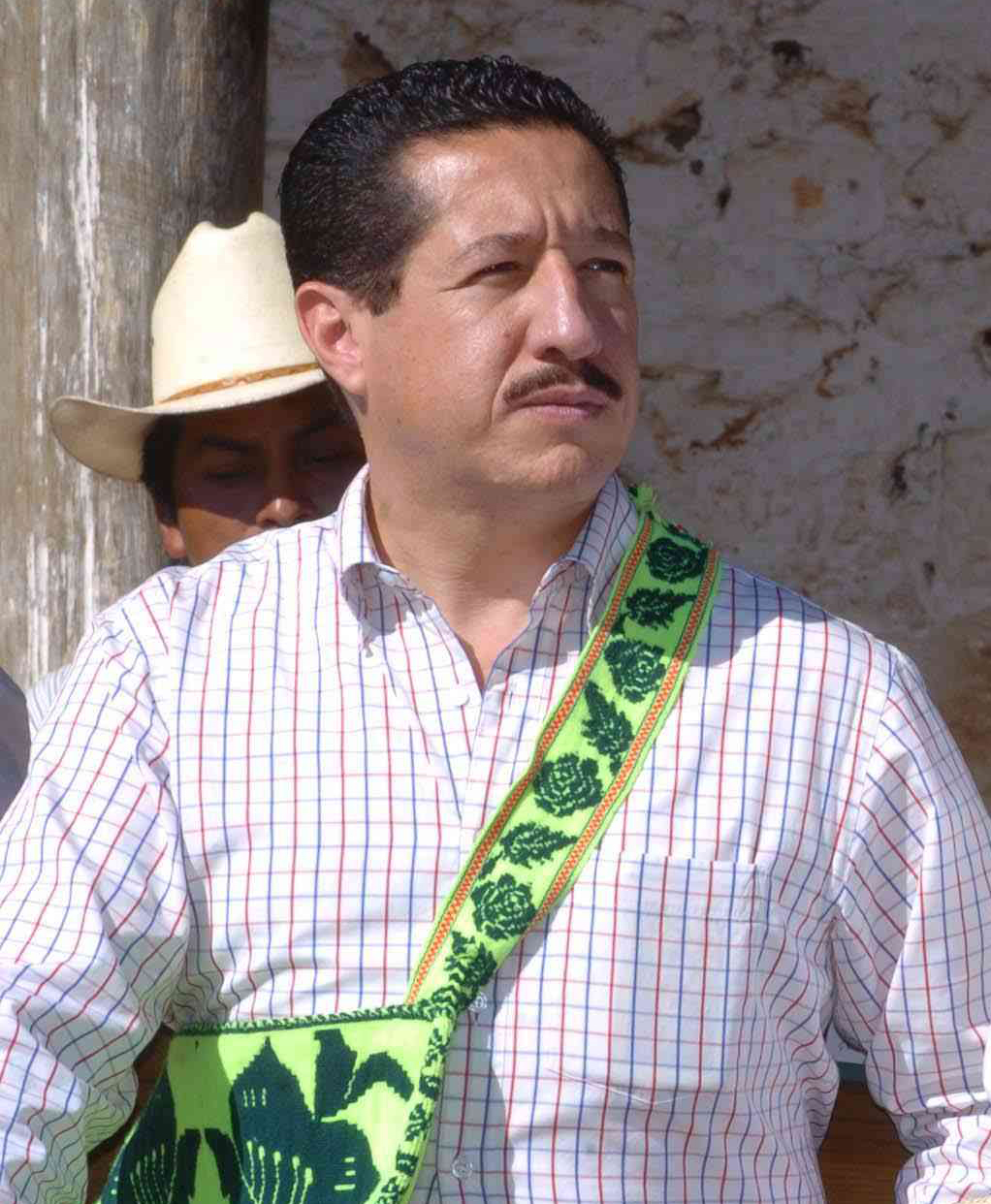
Ney González Sánchez

Ney González Sánchez (Note: In this Spanish name, the first or paternal surname is González and the second or maternal family name is Sánchez.) (born January 25, 1963) is a Mexican politician affiliated with the Institutional Revolutionary Party (PRI). He served as governor of Nayarit from September 2005 to September 18, 2011.

González Sánchez was born in Guadalajara, Jalisco, in 1963, and studied law at the Autonomous University of Nayarit (UAN). He is married to María del Rosario Mejía González, and has three children, Charo, Estefania and Ney.

He was twice elected to the Congress of Nayarit, serving from 1990 to 1993 and from 1996 to 1999. In the 2000 general election, he was elected to the Chamber of Deputies for Nayarit's 2nd district, where he served until 2002 during the 58th Congress. From 2002 to 2004, he was the municipal president of Tepic.

In 2005, Ney González was elected governor of Nayarit. He took office in September 2005 and served until September 2011.

Warrants for his arrest for crimes allegedly committed during his governorship were issued in November 2022. A fugitive from justice since then, he was located in "a North American country" in December 2025. His extradition is being sought.

Preceded by Antonio Echevarría Domínguez	Governor of Nayarit; 2005–2011	Succeeded by Roberto Sandoval
Preceded by María Eugenia Jiménez	Municipal President of Tepic, Nayarit; 2002–2004	Succeeded by Cora Cecilia Pinedo
