= Luis Eduardo Jiménez Agraz =

Mexican politician

- Born: Nayarit, Mexico
- Other name: Luisillo
- Occupation: Politician
- Political party: PRI
- Children: 2

Luis Eduardo Jiménez Agraz is a Mexican politician from the Institutional Revolutionary Party (PRI). From 2002 to 2003 he served as a federal deputy in the 58th Congress, representing Nayarit's second district.
