= Jala, Nayarit =

Municipality in Mexican state of Nayarit

Jala
- Municipality
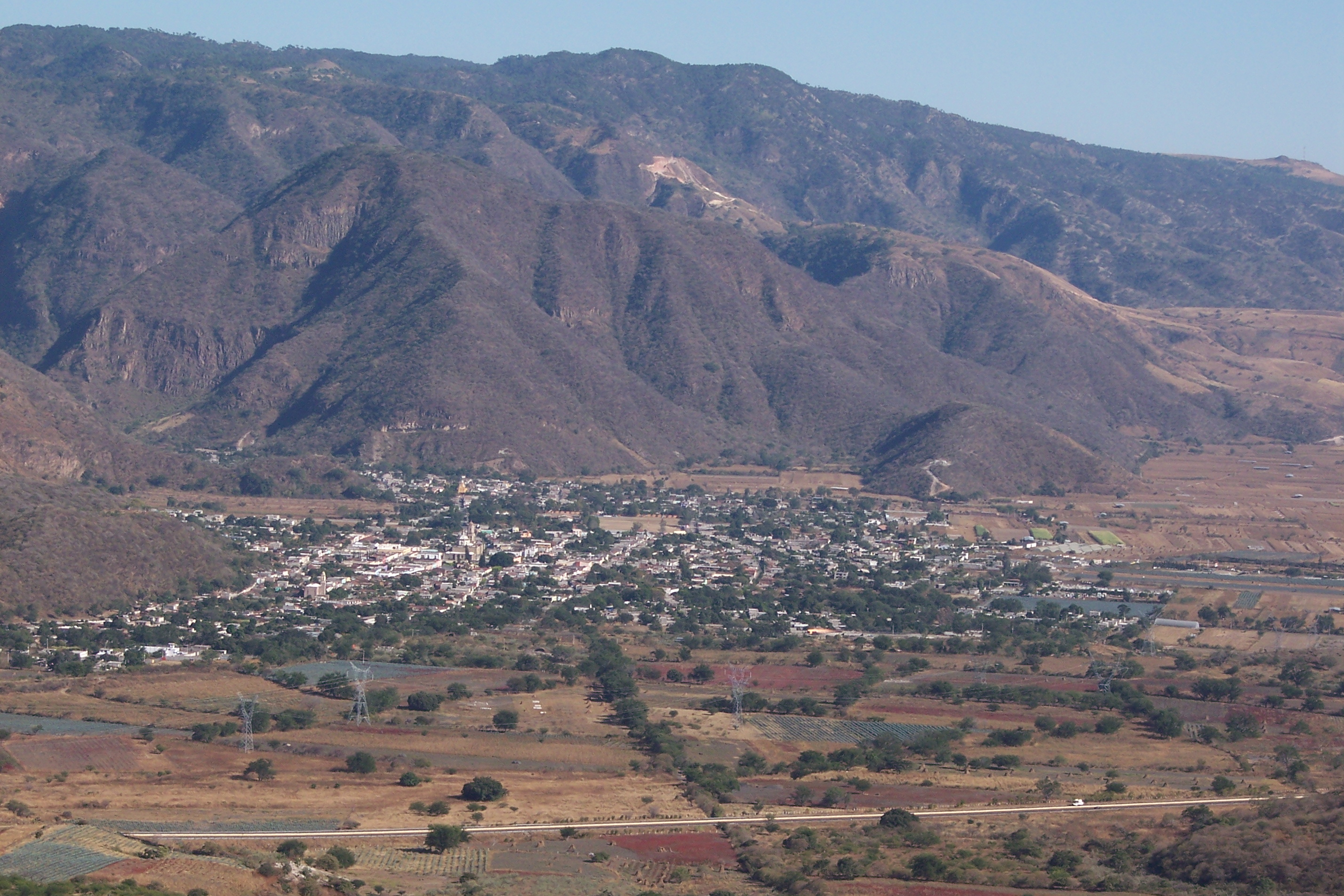

- Location in Mexico Jala (Mexico)
- Country: Mexico
- State: Nayarit

Government
  - Federal electoral district: Nayarit's 3rd
- Demonym: (in Spanish)
- Time zone: UTC−7 (Zona Pacífico)

Jala (Spanish: [ˈxala]) is both a municipality and a town in the Mexican state of Nayarit. As of 2005, the population of the municipality was 16,071, in a total area of 364.60 square kilometers. The population of the municipal seat of the same name was 9,631.

== Etymology ==
The name Jala—place where there is a lot of sand—is derived from the Nahuatl word xali, which means sand, and the variant tla, which means place with a lot of.

== Geography ==
The municipality of Jala is located in the southern part of the state of Nayarit; between parallels 21° 5’ and 21° 20’ latitude north and meridians 104° 18’ and 104° 31’ longitude west. It is bounded in the north by the municipalities of Santa María del Oro and La Yesca; in the south by the municipalities of Ahuacatlán and Ixtlán del Río; in the east with Ixtlán del Río and in the west with Santa María del Oro.

The Rio Grande de Santiago passes in the north of the municipality.

== Economy ==
The economy is based on agriculture with the main crops being corn (maize), sorghum, peanuts, sugarcane, and fruit trees. There is also cattle and swine breeding. Industrial and manufacturing activities include sugarcane mills, sawmills, brickworks, furniture factories, a packing plant for peaches, and several small transformation industries.

== Tourist sites ==
The main site of touristic interest is Ceboruco volcano. It is reached by an 18-km stone-covered road from the main highway. The crater is a 3-km walk up a path from the end of the road.

Ceboruco last erupted from 1870 until 1872 to produce a large flank flow of andesite. According to researchers, in prehistoric times Ceborucco had at least 2 very large eruptions that produced 2 concentric calderas. Ceborucco rises about 1000 m above its base and has a summit elevation of 2,164 metres (7,100 ft). The original volcano was mostly made up of thin andesite lava flows and pyroclastic layers. Since the calderas formed, however, the flows have tended to be thick. See photos at .

There is also an excavation area of an archeological site of a temple and burial grounds thought to date to 700 AD, nearby; one of the few round-based pyramids found in Mexico. Another is just SE of the town of Tequila, and known as Guachimontones.
