= Francisco Javier Castellón =

Mexican politician

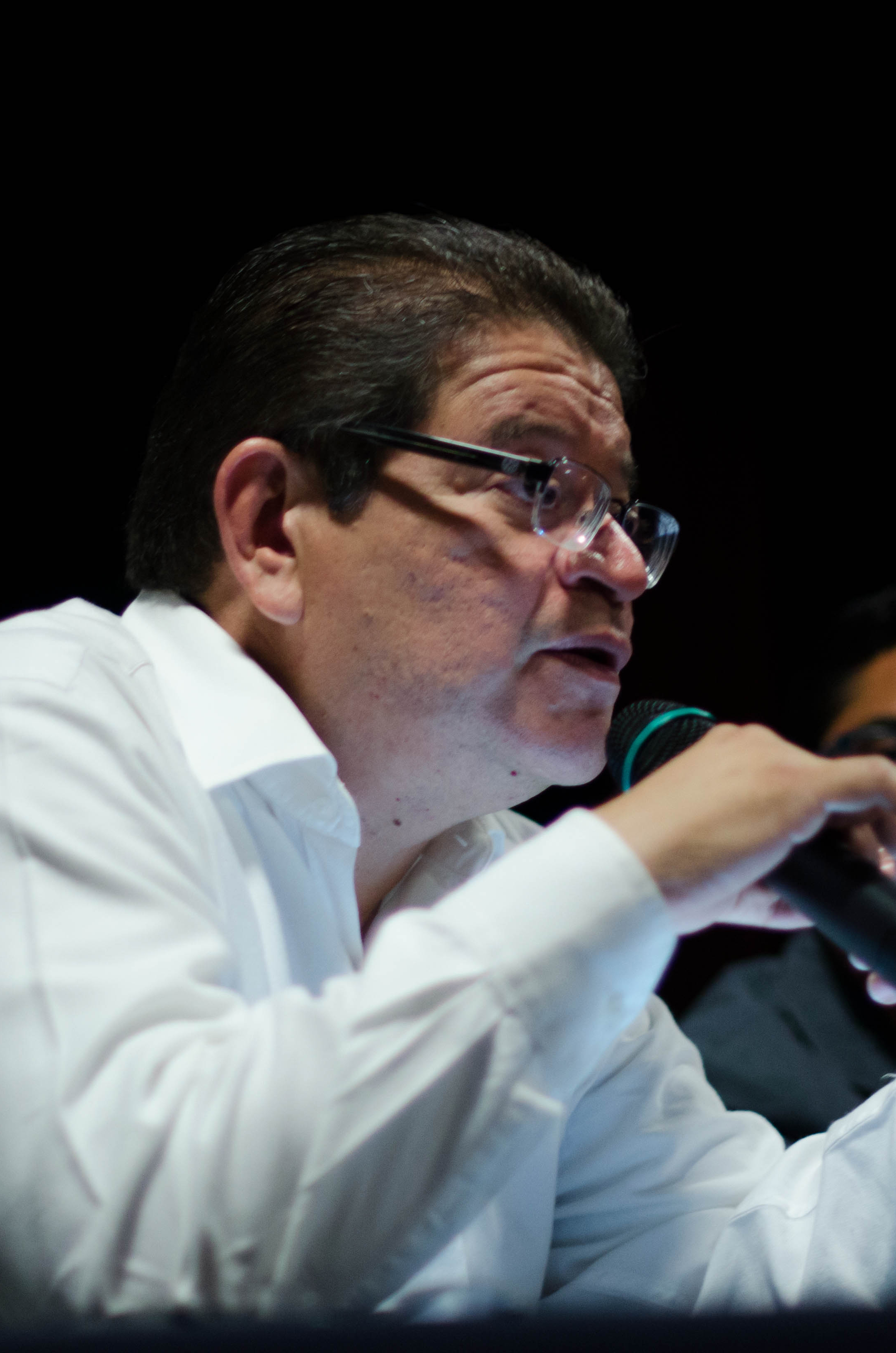
- Born: Guadalupe Francisco Javier Castellón Fonseca; 21 September 1960 (age 65); Santiago Ixcuintla, Nayarit, Mexico
- Education: Autonomous University of Nayarit
- Occupation: Politician
- Political party: PRD
- Website: http://www.castellon.org.mx/

Guadalupe Francisco Javier Castellón Fonseca (born 21 September 1960) is a Mexican politician affiliated with the Party of the Democratic Revolution (PRD). He is a native of Santiago Ixcuintla, Nayarit.

Castellón Fonseca holds a bachelor's degree in economics from the Autonomous University of Nayarit (1982) and a doctorate from the Autonomous University of Baja California (2006). He later served as the rector of the Autonomous University of Nayarit from 1998 to 2004.

In the 2006 general election, he was elected to Nayarit's third Senate seat for the 60th and 61st sessions of Congress, and, in 2017, he was elected municipal president of the state capital, Tepic. He requested a leave of absence as municipal president to contend for a seat in the Congress of Nayarit in 2021.
