= Roberto Sandoval Castañeda =

Mexican politician

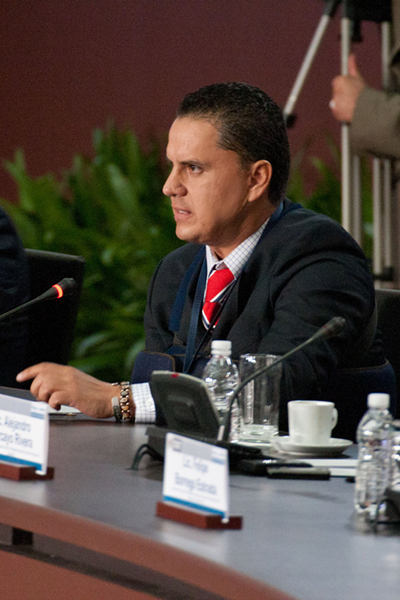

Governor of Nayarit
- In office 19 September 2011 – 18 September 2017
- Preceded by: Ney González Sánchez
- Succeeded by: Antonio Echevarría García

Personal details
- Born: 15 November 1969 (age 56) Tepic, Nayarit, Mexico
- Spouse: Lilia López Torres
- Profession: PRI

Roberto Sandoval Castañeda (born 15 November 1969) is a Mexican politician affiliated with the Institutional Revolutionary Party. From 2011 to 2017 he served as Governor of Nayarit. He also served as Municipal President of Tepic between 2008 and 2011.

Known as "El Roberto", Governor Sandoval became one of the richest men in Nayarit, allegedly by embezzling state funds, extorting businesses, overseeing kidnapping for ransom, and closely collaborating with drug dealers.

The United States Department of the Treasury declared Roberto Sandoval Castañeda and judge Isidro Avelar Gutiérrez "significant drug dealers" on May 17, 2019. Six other individuals and six corporations were similarly sanctioned. Sandoval Castañeda, his wife, his and children were banned from entering the United States on February 28, 2020.

A Mexican judge ordered the arrest of Sandoval Castañeda and his daughter Lidy on charges of money laundering on March 1, 2021.

On June 6, 2021, Sandoval was arrested in Nuevo León by FGR agents, SEDENA, National Guard, and National Center of Intelligence of Nuevo León. His daughter was accompanying him.

| Preceded by Ney González Sánchez | Governor of Nayarit; 2011 — 2017 | Succeeded by Antonio Echevarría García |
