= María Eugenia Jiménez Valenzuela =

Mexican politician

- Born: 7 November 1940 (age 85); Nayarit, Mexico
- Occupation: Politician
- Political party: PRD (1989–2009)

María Eugenia Jiménez Valenzuela (born 7 November 1940) is a Mexican politician formerly affiliated with the Party of the Democratic Revolution. As of 2014 she served as Deputy of the LX Legislature of the Mexican Congress representing Nayarit. She also served as Mayor of Tepic from 2001 to 2002.

Preceded by Justino Ávila Arce	Municipal President Substitute of Tepic, Nayarit; 2001–2002	Succeeded by Ney González Sánchez
