= Santa María del Oro, Nayarit =

Coordinates: 21.332654°N 104.587226°W

Santa María del Oro
- Municipality
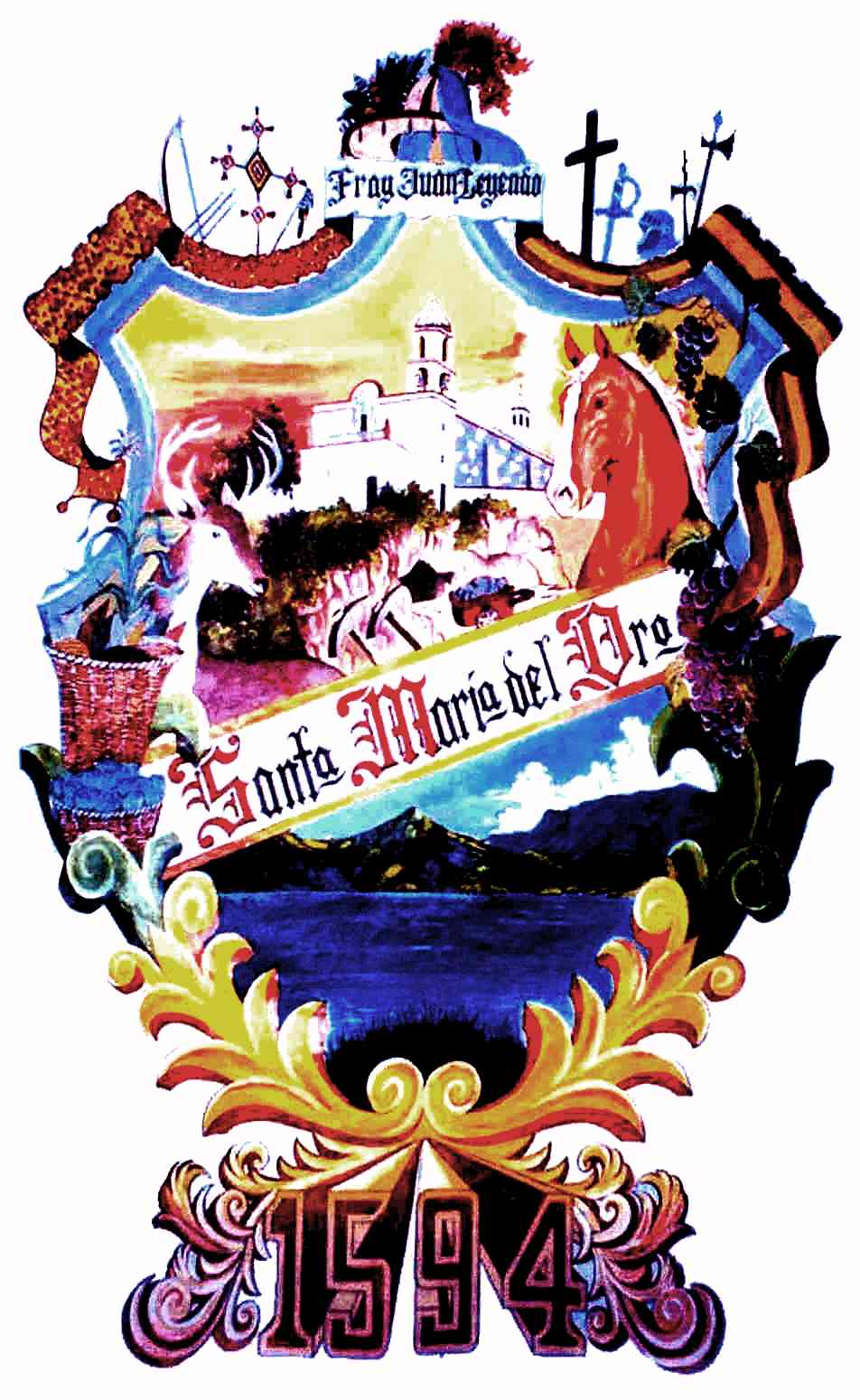
- Coat of arms

- Location in Mexico Santa María del Oro (Mexico)
- Country: Mexico
- State: Nayarit

Government
  - Federal electoral district: Nayarit's 3rd
- Demonym: (in Spanish)
- Time zone: UTC−7 (Zona Pacífico)

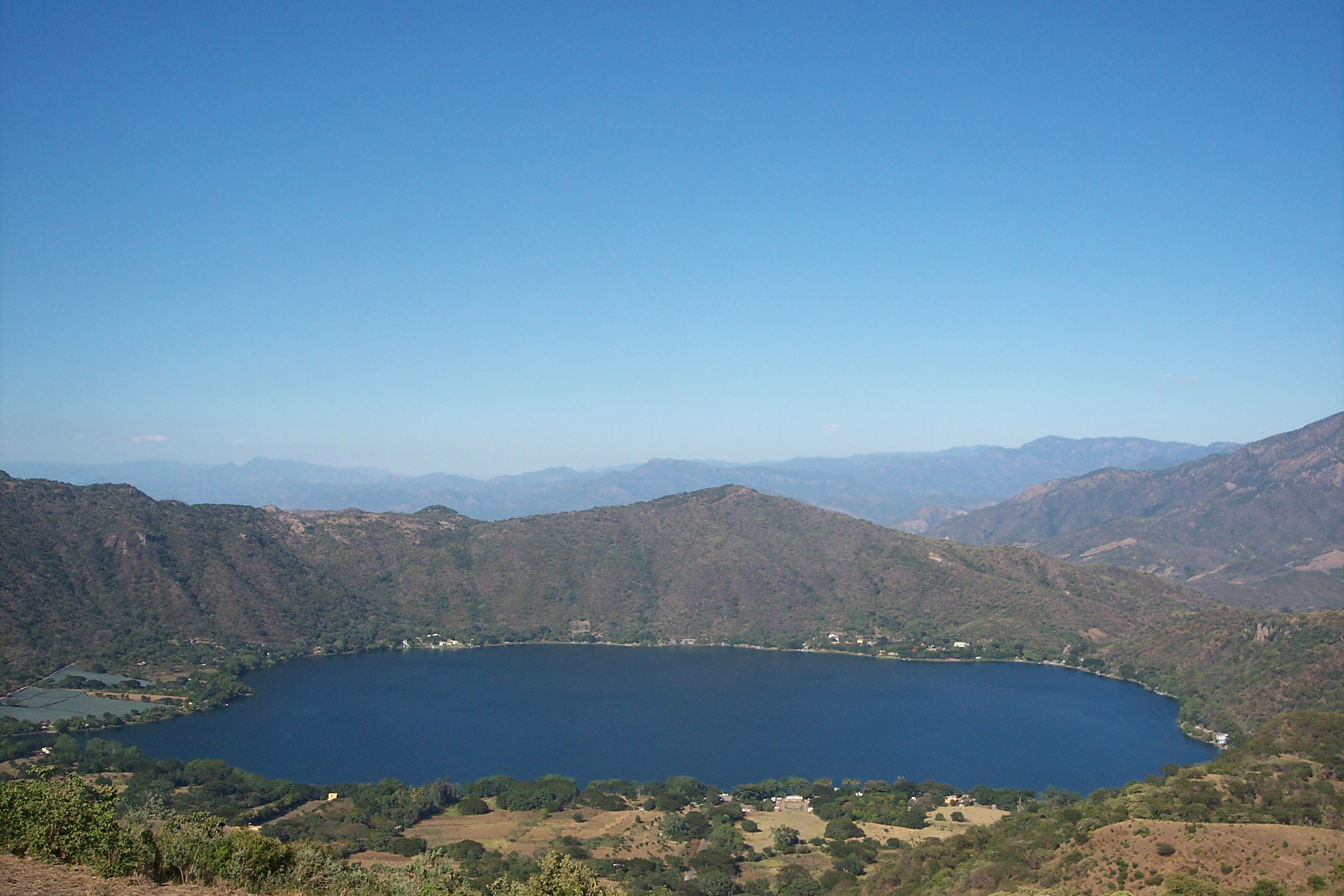
Crater lake

Santa María del Oro is a municipality and municipal seat in the Mexican state of Nayarit. It is located in the south of the state and has boundaries with the municipalities of El Nayar, Tepic, Ahuacatlán, Jala, San Pedro Lagunillas, La Yesca, and Xalisco. The population was 21,688 in 2005, with the municipal seat of the same name having 3,314 inhabitants. The total area was 912.90 km^{2}.

Sant María del Oro is famous for the crater lake of the same name, located east of the town. This lake has a modest tourist infrastructure and attracts many national and foreign tourists to the area.

The economy is based on tourism and agriculture. Corn, peanuts, and sugarcane are the most important crops. There is also a sizable cattle herd and the raising of poultry has increased in recent years.

The major river Río Grande de Santiago crosses the northern region of the municipality.
