= Governor of Nayarit =

Chief executive of the Mexican state of Nayarit

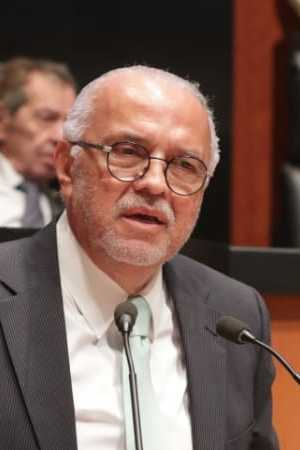
- Incumbent; Miguel Ángel Navarro Quintero since September 19, 2021
- Term length: Six years, non-renewable.
- Inaugural holder: José María Ferreira
- Formation: April 24, 1917

The governor of Nayarit is the chief executive of Nayarit.

== Governors of Nayarit ==
List of governors of Nayarit since the state's creation in 1917:

Name	Title	Term
José María Ferreira	Jefe Político	1917
José Santos Godínez	Gobernador Constitucional	1918–1919
Francisco D. Santiago	Jefe Político	1919–1920
Fernando S. Ibarra	Gobernador Interino	1920
Salvador Arriola Valdés	Gobernador Interino	1920
José Santos Godínez	Gobernador Constitucional	1920–1921
Federico R. Corona	Gobernador Interino	1921
Pascual Villanueva Paredes	Gobernador Constitucional	1921–1925
Julián Chávez	Gobernador Interino	1923
Rodolfo Moroña	Gobernador Interino	1924
Pablo Retes Zepeda	Gobernador Interino	1924
Everardo Peña Navarro	Gobernador Interino	1924
Miguel Díaz González	Gobernador Interino	1925
Ismael Romero Gallardo	Gobernador Interino	1925
Felipe C. Ríos	Gobernador Interino	1925
Ricardo Velarde Osuna	Gobernador Interino	1925
Francisco Jaime Hernández	Jefe Político	1925
José de la Peña Ledón	Gobernador Constitucional	1926–1929
Francisco Ramírez Romero	Jefe Político	1927–1928
Esteban Baca Calderón	Jefe Político	1928–1929
Francisco Anguiano Ortiz	Gobernador Interino	1929
Gustavo R. Cristo	Gobernador Interino	1929
J. Jesús Valdés Sánchez	Gobernador Interino	1929
Salvador Trejo	Gobernador Interino	1929
Luis Castillo Ledón	Gobernador Constitucional	1930–1933
Rafael Ibarra Trujillo	Gobernador Interino	1931
Juventino Espinoza Sánchez	Gobernador Interino	1931–1933
Ramón Narváez	Gobernador Interino	1933
Gustavo B. Azcárraga	Gobernador Interino	1933
Agustín Godínez Lomelí	Gobernador Interino	1934
José Ibarra Valdés	Gobernador Interino	1934
Lamberto Luna Plata	Gobernador Interino	1934
Francisco Parra Ortiz	Gobernador Constitucional	1934–1938
Tomás López Partida	Gobernador Interino	1935
Joaquín Cardoso	Gobernador Interino	1935–1937
Eduardo López Vidrio	Gobernador Interino	1937
Juventino Espinoza Sánchez	Gobernador Constitucional	1938–1941
Cuauhtémoc Ríos Martínez	Gobernador Interino	1938
José Luis Herrera López	Gobernador Interino	1938
Antíoco Rodríguez	Gobernador Interino	1939
Heriberto Parra	Gobernador Interino	1940
Candelario Miramontes Briseño	Gobernador Constitucional	1942–1945
Rodolfo Enríquez Hernández	Gobernador Interino	1945
Gilberto Flores Muñoz	Gobernador Constitucional	1946–1951
José Limón Guzmán	Gobernador Constitucional	1952–1957
Francisco García Montero	Gobernador Constitucional	1958–1963
Julián Gazcón Mercado	Gobernador Constitucional	1964–1969
Roberto Gómez Reyes	Gobernador Constitucional	1970–1975
Rogelio Flores Curiel	Gobernador Constitucional	1976–1981
Emilio Manuel González Parra	Gobernador Constitucional	1982–1987
Celso Humberto Delgado Ramírez	Gobernador Constitucional	1988–1993
Rigoberto Ochoa Zaragoza	Gobernador Constitucional	1994–1999
Antonio Echevarría Domínguez	Gobernador Constitucional	1999–2005
Ney González Sánchez	Gobernador Constitucional	2005–2011
Roberto Sandoval Castañeda	Gobernador Constitucional	2011–2017
Antonio Echevarría García	Gobernador Constitucional	2017–2021
Miguel Ángel Navarro Quintero	Gobernador Constitucional	2021–2027
