= Roy Argel Gómez Olguín =

Mexican politician

- Born: 24 October 1973 (age 52); Tepic, Nayarit, Mexico
- Occupation: Deputy
- Political party: PRI

Roy Argel Gómez Olguín (born 24 October 1973) is a Mexican politician affiliated with the PRI. He currently serves as Deputy of the LXII Legislature of the Mexican Congress representing Nayarit.
