= Tepic Municipality =

Tepic
- Municipality
- Coat of arms

- Location of Tepic Municipality in Nayarit
- Coordinates: 21°38′N 104°51′W
- Country: Mexico
- State: Nayarit
- Seat: Tepic

Government
  - Federal electoral district: Nayarit's 2nd

Population (2020)
  - Total: 425,924
- Time zone: UTC−07:00 (Zona Pacífico)

The Municipality of Tepic is one of the 20 municipalities dividing the Mexican state of Nayarit, being the most populous and most densely populated municipality in Nayarit; its head city (the seat of the municipal government), the city of Tepic, is also the capital of the state.

== Geography ==
The municipality of Tepic is located in the center-south zone of the state of Nayarit, just at the foot of the Sierra Madre Oriental mountain range and in its transition towards the Pacific Coastal Plain. It has a territorial extension of 766 sq mi (1983.3 km^{2}) that represent 7.25% of the total extension of Nayarit, ranking it as the sixth most extensive municipality in the state. Its geographic coordinates are 21° 23'N - 21° 52'N and 104° 35'W - 105° 09'W and its altitude ranges from a maximum of 7,546 feet (2,300 m) to a minimum of 328 feet (100 m) above sea level.

== Demography ==
According to the results of the 2020 General Census of Population and Housing conducted by the National Institute of Statistics and Geography (INEGI), the municipality of Tepic has a total population of 425,924 people, of which 49.6% (211,258) are men and 50.4% (214,666) are women.

=== Localities ===
In the municipality of Tepic there are 138 localities. List of localities with population above 1,000 include:

Locality	Population
Municipality Population Total	380,249
Tepic	332,863
Francisco I. Madero (Puga)	7,091
San Cayetano	4,345
Camichin de Jauja	2,358
Bellavista	2,291
El Jicote	1,882
Atonalisco	1,711
Santiago of Pochotitán	1,668
CEFERESO	1,362
Lo de Lamedo	1,356
San Luis of Lozada	1,187
La Cantera	
	1,148
Colonia 6 de Enero	1,141
La Corregidora	1,089
La Fortuna	1,046

== Politics ==
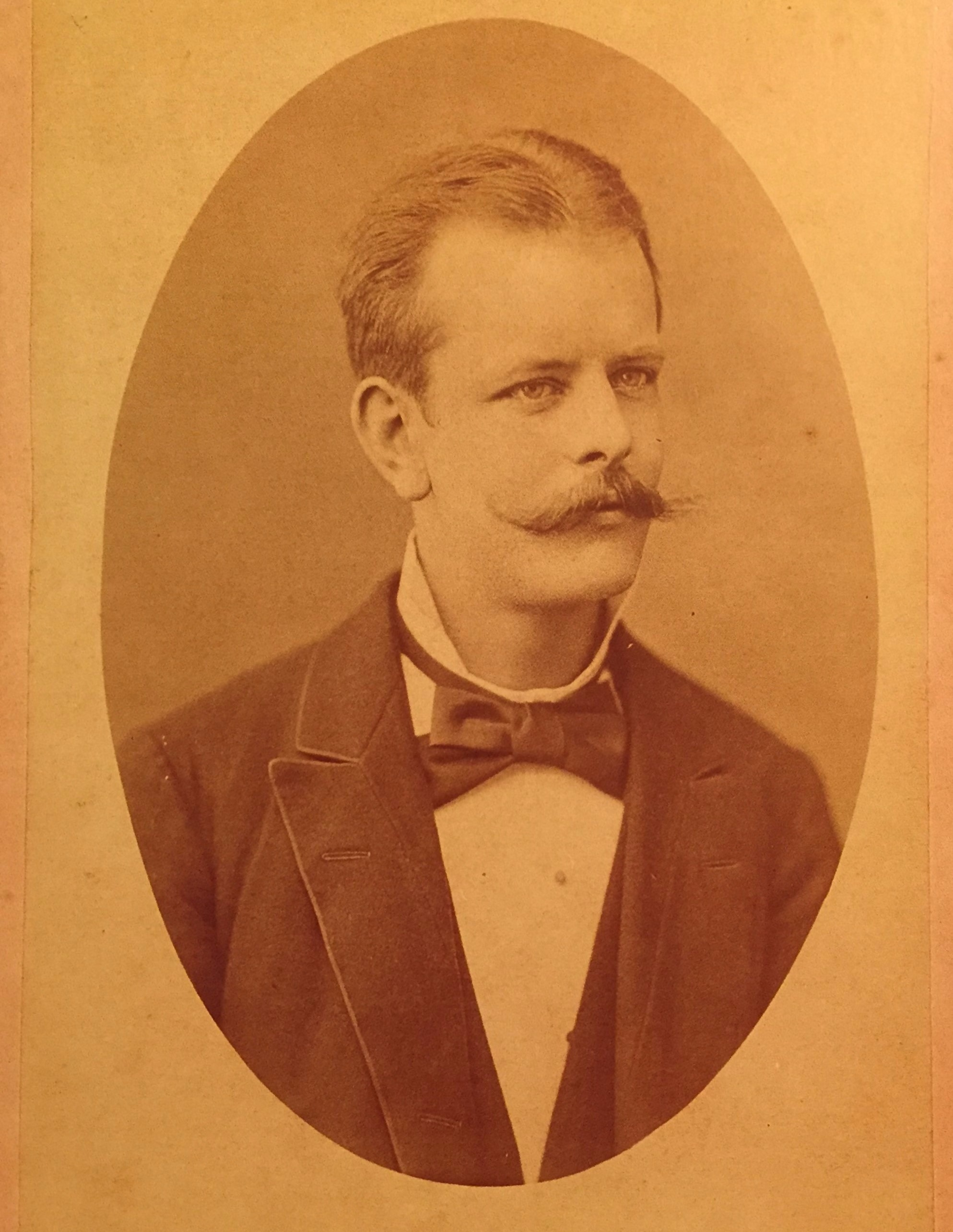
Jorge Federico Beyer Witthofftt, municipal president of Tepic from 1912 to 1915

The government of the municipality corresponds to the City Council which is made up of the municipal president, a syndic and 16 councillors; all are elected by free, direct and secret popular vote for a period of three years, not re-eligible for the immediate period but discontinuously, and they enter to exercise their positions on September 17 of the year of their election.

=== Legislative representation ===
For the election of local deputies to the Congress of Nayarit and of federal deputies to the Chamber of Deputies, the municipality of Tepic is included in the following electoral districts:

- I Local Electoral District of Nayarit (Tepic).
- II Local Electoral District of Nayarit (Tepic).
- III Local Electoral District of Nayarit (Tepic).
- II Federal Electoral District of Nayarit (Tepic).

=== Municipal presidents ===
Term	Municipal president	Political party	Notes
1912–1915	Jorge Federico Beyer Witthofftt		
1915	Carlos Castilla		
1916–1917	Francisco Anguiano Ortiz		
1918	Román Rojas		
1919	J. Isaac Jiménez		
1920	Juan Arana V.		
1921–1922	José María Terán		
1923–1924	José Santos Rodríguez		
1925–1926	Ignacio de la Torre		
1927–1928	Salvador Amezcua		
1929–1930	Aurelio Guerrero Híjar	PNR	
1931–1932	Luis G. Hernández	PNR	
1933–1934	Everardo Peña Navarro	PNR	
1935–1936	Eduardo López Vidrio	PNR	
1937–1938	Amado Jiménez Borrayo	PNR; PRM	
1939–1940	Roberto H. Hernández	PRM	
1941–1942	Froylán Amaral	PRM	
1943–1944	Rnrique Ruvalcaba	PRM	
1945	J. Jesús Mora Yáñez	PRM	
01/01/1946–31/12/1948	Tomás Rojas Cardiel	PRI	
01/01/1949–31/12/1951	Ignacio Cuesta Barrios	PRI	
01/01/1952–31/12/1954	Felipe Ibarra Partida	PRI	
01/01/1955–31/12/1957	Alberto Medina Muñoz	PRI	
01/01/1958–31/12/1960	Ignacio Delgadillo de la Paz	PRI	
01/01/1961–31/12/1963	José Vicente Ruelas Preciado	PRI	
01/01/1964–31/12/1966	Alfonso Orozco Ortega	PRI	
01/01/1967–31/12/1969	Neófito Haro Carrillo	PRI	
01/01/1970–31/12/1972	J. Jesús Hernández Guillén	PRI	
01/01/1973–1975	Alejandro Gascón Mercado	PPS	He applied for a temporary leave to run for the Nayarit governor office
1975–31/12/1975	Rafael Gómez Aguilar	PPS	Acting municipal president
1976–1978	José Ramón Navarro Quintero	PRI	
1978–1981	José Félix Torres Haro	PRI	
1981–1984	José Manuel Rivas Allende	PRI	
1984–1987	Braulio Pérez Valdivia	PRI	
1987–1990	Remigio Rosales Vega	PRI	
1990–1993	Alejandro Rivas Curiel	PRI	
17/09/1993–16/09/1996	Raúl Mejía	PRI	
17/09/1996–16/09/1999	José Félix Torres Haro	PRI	
17/09/1999–12/11/2001	Justino Ávila Arce	PAN; PRD; PT; PRS	Alliance for Change. He died while in office
13/11/2001–16/09/2002	María Eugenia Jiménez Valenzuela	PAN; PRD; PT; PRS	Alliance for Change. Acting municipal president
17/09/2002–15/12/2004	Ney González Sánchez	PRI	He applied for a temporary leave to run for the Nayarit governor office
16/12/2004–16/09/2005	Cora Cecilia Pinedo Alonso	PRI	Acting municipal president
17/09/2005–16/09/2008	Manuel Humberto Cota Jiménez	PRI	
17/09/2008–10/01/2011	Roberto Sandoval Castañeda	PRI	He applied for a temporary leave to run for the Nayarit governor office
11/01/2011–16/09/2011	Georgina López Arias	PRI	Acting municipal president
17/09/2011–16/09/2014	Héctor González Curiel	PRI; PVEM; Panal	Coalition "Nayarit Unites Us"
17/09/2014–24/11/2016	Leopoldo Domínguez González	PAN; PRD	He applied for a temporary leave to run for the Nayarit governor office
24/11/2016–16/09/2017	David Guerrero Castellón	PAN; PRD	Acting municipal president
17/09/2017–08/03/2021	Francisco Javier Castellón Fonseca	PAN; PRD; PT; PRS	Coalition "Together For You"
08/03/2021–16/09/2021	Miguel Ángel Arce Montiel	PAN; PRD; PT; PRS	Coalition "Together For You". Acting municipal president
17/09/2021–01/05/2023	Geraldine Ponce	Morena; PVEM; PT; Panal	
02/05/2023–19/06/2023	Hugo Alejandro Galván Araiza	Morena; PVEM; PT; Panal	Acting municipal president
20/06/2023–13/07/2023	Geraldine Ponce	Morena; PVEM; PT; Panal	Temporarily resumed
14/07/2023–27/08/2023	Martha Leticia Araiza Velasco	Unaffiliated	Acting municipal president
28/08/2023–29/02/2024	Geraldine Ponce	Morena; PVEM; PT; Panal	
01/03/2024–06/08/2024	Martha Leticia Araiza Velasco	Unaffiliated	Acting municipal president
07/08/2024–16/09/2024	Geraldine Ponce	Morena; PVEM; PT; Panal	She resumed, to finish her first triennium (three-year period)
17/09/2024–	Geraldine Ponce	Morena; PVEM; PT; Panal	She was reelected
