= Gloria Elizabeth Núñez Sánchez =

Mexican politician (born 1984)

Senator of the Congress of the Union from Nayarit First Minority
- Incumbent
- Assumed office 1 September 2018 Serving with Cora Cecilia Pinedo Alonso and Miguel Ángel Navarro Quintero
- Preceded by: Martha Elena García Gómez

Personal details
- Born: 20 March 1984 (age 42) Jalisco, Mexico
- Party: MC (2022–present)
- Other political affiliations: PAN (2016–2022); PRI (2007–2016)
- Occupation: Deputy

Gloria Elizabeth Núñez Sánchez (born 20 March 1984) is a Mexican politician originally affiliated with the Institutional Revolutionary Party (PRI).

In 2012–2015 she served as a federal deputy in the 62nd Congress, representing Nayarit's third district for the PRI. In the 2018 general election she was elected to the Senate for the state of Nayarit; she served during the 64th Congress (2018–2021) as a member of the National Action Party (PAN) and, during the 65th Congress (2021–2024), as a member of the Citizens' Movement (MC).
