= Cora Cecilia Pinedo =

Mexican politician

Senator of the Congress of the Union from Nayarit First Formula
- Incumbent
- Assumed office 1 September 2018 Serving with Miguel Ángel Navarro Quintero and Gloria Elizabeth Núñez Sánchez
- Preceded by: Manuel Cota Jiménez

Personal details
- Born: Cora Cecilia Pinedo Alonso; 26 November 1967 (age 58) Nayarit, Mexico
- Party: PT
- Other political affiliations: PANAL
- Occupation: Politician

Cora Cecilia Pinedo Alonso (born 26 November 1967) is a Mexican politician from the Labor Party. From 2009 to 2012 she served as Deputy of the LXI Legislature of the Mexican Congress representing Nayarit.

== Honours ==
- Order of the Rising Sun, Gold Rays and Neck Ribbon (2023)

Preceded by Ney González Sánchez	Municipal President (Substitute) of Tepic, Nayarit; 2004–2005	Succeeded by Manuel Humberto Cota Jiménez
