= Congress of Nayarit =

Legislature of the Mexican state of Nayarit

Congress of Nayarit Congreso del Estado de Nayarit
- 34th session (2024–2027)

Type
- Type: Unicameral

Structure
- Seats: 30 deputies
- Political groups: Morena (16) PT (4) PVEM (4) PAN (3) MLN (1) PNA (1) PRI (1)
- Length of term: 3 years
- Authority: Political Constitution of the Free and Sovereign State of Nayarit
- Salary: MX$31,700 per month (2017)

Elections
- Voting system: 18 by first-past-the-post and 12 by proportional representation
- Last election: 2 June 2024
- Next election: 2027

Meeting place
- Tepic, Nayarit, Mexico

Website
- congresonayarit.gob.mx

The Congress of Nayarit (Spanish: Congreso del Estado de Nayarit) is the legislature of the Mexican state of Nayarit. It meets in the state capital, Tepic.

== Structure ==
The Congress of Nayarit is unicameral and consists of 30 deputies (Spanish: diputados), 18 elected by first-past-the-post in single-member districts (SMDs) and 12 elected by proportional representation (PR) from state-wide party lists. Deputies may be re-elected for up to four consecutive three-year terms.

Nayarit's 18 local electoral districts were determined by the National Electoral Institute (INE) in its 2021–2023 redistricting plan, which is to remain in force until 2030.

In two of the SMDs – the 1st (Acaponeta) and 3rd (Jesús María) – Indigenous and Afrodescendent inhabitants account for over 40% of the total population and they are therefore classified by the INE as indigenous districts.

== Powers and authority ==
Title 3 of the state constitution establishes the legal framework within which the Congress of Nayarit operates.

- Chapter I sets out the rules for elections and the eligibility of candidates.
- Chapter II governs the installation of Congress and its legislative sessions.
- Chapter III lists the powers invested in Congress.
- Chapter IV describes the procedures to be followed for enacting legislation.
- Chapter V establishes provisions for when Congress is in recess.

== Creation ==
The state of Nayarit was created in 1917 from the Territory of Tepic with the enactment that year of the national constitution. On 22 September 1917, the interim governor, Jesús María Ferreira, issued a decree calling for the election of a constituent congress and a governor for the state. The first session of the Congress of Nayarit was installed on 25 December, and promulgated the state constitution on 5 February 1918, on the first anniversary of the 1917 federal constitution.

== 2024 election ==
Further information (in Spanish): es:Elecciones estatales de Nayarit de 2024

Local elections were held in Nayarit on 2 June 2024, concurrently with the general election. In addition to the members of the state congress, voters also elected new authorities for the state's 20 municipalities.
