= Cabinet of Emilio González Márquez =

Cabinet of former Governor of Jalisco, Emilio González Márquez

- Cabinet of State of Jalisco
- Date formed: 1 March 2007
- Date dissolved: 28 February 2013

People and organisations
- Governor: Emilio González Márquez
- Governor's history: Former Municipal president of Guadalajara (2004–2005)
- No. of ministers: 21
- Total no. of members: 28
- Member party: National Action Party
- Status in legislature: Majority government (2006–2009); Divided government (2009–2012)
- Opposition party: Institutional Revolutionary Party in alliance with New Alliance Party

History
- Election: 2006 Jalisco state election
- Legislature terms: 58th Jalisco Legislature (01/02/2007–31/01/2010); 59th Jalisco Legislature (01/02/2010–31/10/2012)
- Advice and consent: Congress of the State of Jalisco
- Predecessor: Cabinet of Francisco Javier Ramírez Acuña
- Successor: Cabinet of Aristóteles Sandoval

Emilio González Márquez assumed office as Governor of the State of Jalisco on 1 March 2007, and his term ended on 28 February 2013. The governor has the authority to nominate members of his Cabinet of the State of Jalisco, as per the Ley Orgánica del Poder Ejecutivo del Estado de Jalisco, Article 4, Section V.

== Cabinet ==
=== Cabinet officials on 1 March 2007 ===
Office	Holder	Political party
Secretaría General de Gobierno; General Secretariat of Government	Fernando Guzmán Pérez Peláez	PAN
Secretaría de Finanzas Secretariat of Finance	Óscar García Manzano y Pérez Múgica	Unaffiliated
Coordinación General de Innovación y Desarrollo General Coordination of Innovation and Development	Herbert Taylor Arthur	PAN
Coordinación de Políticas Públicas Coordination of Public Policy	Alonso Ulloa Vélez	PAN
Secretaría de Salud Secretariat of Health	Alfonso Gutiérrez Carranza	PAN
Secretaría de Administración Secretariat of Administration	José Luis de Alba González	PAN
Secretaría de Seguridad Pública Secretariat of Public Security	Luis Carlos Nájera Gutiérrez de Velasco	Unaffiliated
Procuraduría General de Justicia del Estado State General Attorney of Justice	Tomás Coronado Olmos	PAN
Secretaría de Vialidad y Transporte Secretariat of Ways and Transportation	José Manuel Verdín Díaz	PAN
Secretaría de Planeación Secretariat of Planning	Víctor Manuel González Romero	PAN
Secretaría de Desarrollo Urbano Secretariat of Urban Development	Sergio Carmona Ruvalcaba	PAN
Secretaría de Educación Secretariat of Education	Miguel Ángel Martínez Espinoza	PAN
Secretaría del Medio Ambiente para el Desarrollo Sustentable Secretariat of the Environment for Sustainable Development	Martha Ruth del Toro Gaytán	PAN
Secretaría de Trabajo y Previsión Social Secretariat of Labor and Social Prevision	Ernesto Espinosa Guarro	PAN
Secretaría de Desarrollo Rural Secretariat of Rural Development	Álvaro García Chávez	PAN
Secretaría de Promoción Económica Secretariat of Economic Promotion	Guillermo Martínez Mora	PAN
Secretaría de Cultura Secretariat of Culture	Alejandro Cravioto Lebrija	PAN
Secretaría de Turismo Secretariat of Tourism	Aurelio López Rocha	Unaffiliated
Procuraduría Social Social Attorney	Pedro Ruiz Higuera	PAN
Contraloría del Estado Comptrollership of the State	María del Carmen Mendoza Flores	PAN
Secretaría de Desarrollo Humano Secretariat of Human Development	Martín Hernández Balderas	PAN
Comisión Estatal de Agua y Saneamiento State Commission of Water and Sanitation	César Luis Coll Carabias	PAN
Coordinación de Proyectos de Movilidad Urbana Coordination of Urban Mobility Projects	Diego Monraz Villaseñor	PAN
Code y Juegos Panamericanos Code and Pan American Games	Carlos Andrade Garín	PAN
Coordinación de la "Gran Alianza por Jalisco" Coordination of the "Great Alliance for Jalisco"	Leonardo García Camarena	PAN
Dirección de Comunicación Social Social Communication Department	Fernando Chávez Sánchez	PAN
Secretario Particular Particular Secretary	Antonio Gloria Morales	PAN
Responsable del Sistema DIF Jalisco Head of the Jalisco DIF System	Felipe Valdez de Anda	PAN
