= Timeline of Guadalajara =

The following is a timeline of the history of the city of Guadalajara, Mexico.

== Prior to 19th century ==
- 1542 – February 14: Guadalajara founded in New Spain.
- 1560
  - Town becomes capital of Nueva Galicia province.
  - Royal Audiencia of Guadalajara relocated to Guadalajara from Compostela.
- 1591 – Jesuit college founded.
- 1618 – Guadalajara Cathedral built.
- 1690 – Sanctuary of Nuestra Señora del Carmen founded.
- 1692 – Templo de San Francisco de Asís (church) built.
- 1774 – Governor's Palace built on Plaza de Armas.
- 1786 – Spanish intendancy established.
- 1792
  - University of Guadalajara founded.
  - Population: 24,249.
- 1795 – Consulado (merchant guild) established.

== 19th century ==
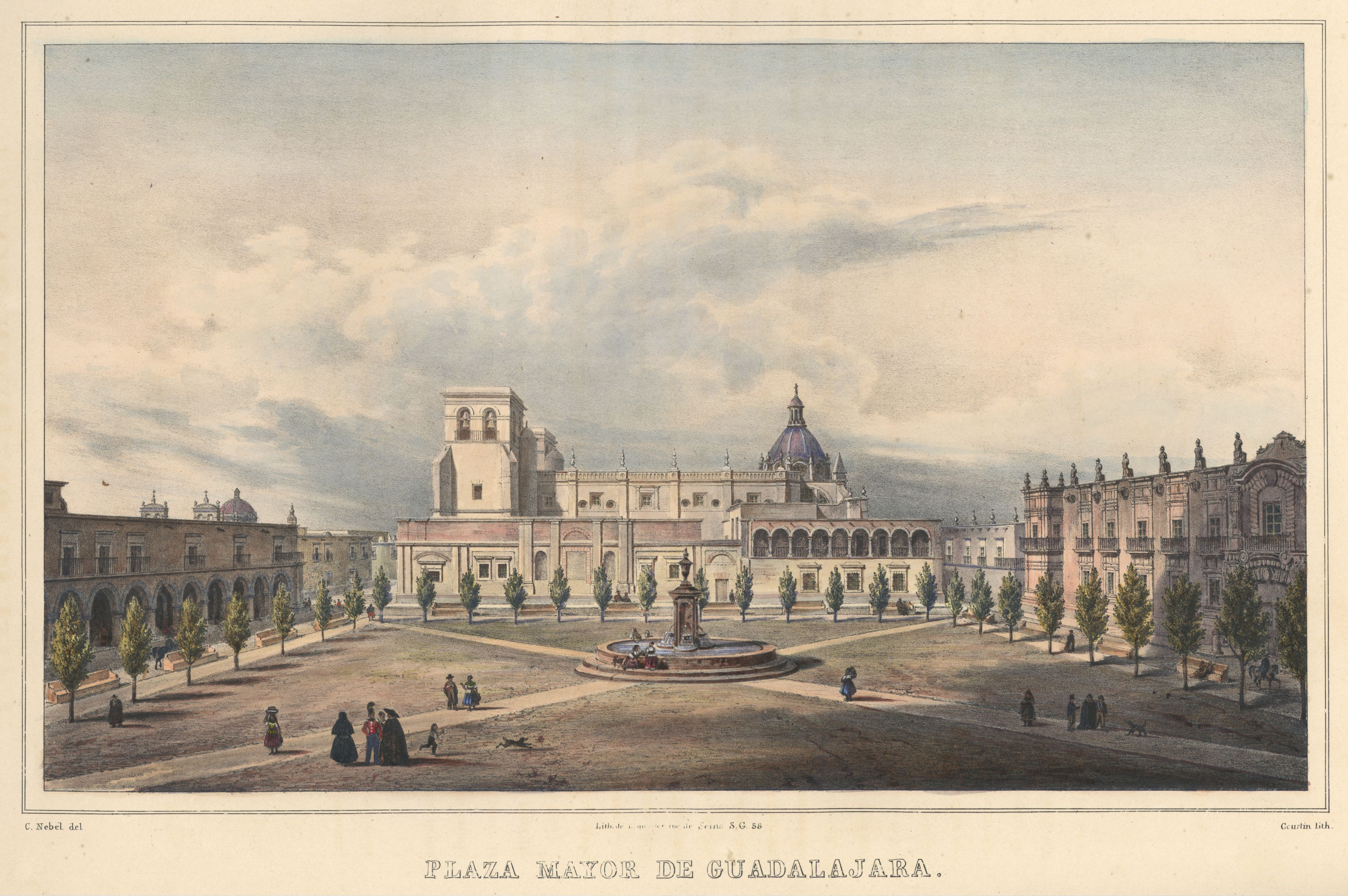
Plaza Mayor, Guadalajara, ca.1830s

- 1811 – Mint built.
- 1817 – May 31: Severe earthquake.
- 1829 – Hospicio Cabañas inaugurated.
- 1848 – Panteón de Belén (cemetery) established.
- 1849 – Earthquake.
- 1854 – Guadalajara Cathedral towers rebuilt.
- 1859 – War of Reform (approximate date).
- 1861 – Public Library of the State of Jalisco established.
- 1863 – French occupation begins.
- 1866
  - Teatro Degollado inaugurated.
  - French occupation ends.
- 1867 – Club Popular de Artesanos active.
- 1875 – Earthquake.
- 1895 – Population: 83,934.
- 1896 – Casa de los Perros built.
- 1897 – Templo Expiatorio del Santísimo Sacramento (church) construction begins.
- 1900 – Population: 101,208.

== 20th century ==
- 1906 – Club Deportivo Guadalajara (football club) formed.
- 1907 – Automobile Club of Guadalajara conducts car race near city.
- 1908 – Southern Pacific railway begins operating.
- 1914 – Mexican Revolution.
- 1916 – Club Atlas (football club) formed.
- 1917 – El Informador newspaper begins publication.
- 1925 – University of Guadalajara re-established.
- 1932 – June 3: 1932 Jalisco earthquake.
- 1939 – José Clemente Orozco paints murals in the Hospicio Cabañas.
- 1942
  - El Occidental newspaper begins publication.
  - Alameda Theatre opens.
- 1950
  - Jalisco Philharmonic Orchestra established.
  - Population: 378,423.
- 1952 – Rotonda de los Jaliscienses Ilustres and Town Hall built.
- 1954 – XEWK-AM radio begins broadcasting.
- 1958 – San Juan de Dios Market inaugurated.
- 1960
  - Jalisco Stadium opens.
  - Population: 740,396.
- 1966 – Miguel Hidalgo y Costilla International Airport opens.
- 1968 – Centro de Enseñanza Técnica Industrial founded.
- 1969 – Plaza del Sol shopping mall in business.
- 1972 – Templo Expiatorio del Santísimo Sacramento (church) built.
- 1973 – Liga Comunista 23 de Septiembre formed.
- 1975 – Federation of Low-Income Neighbourhoods formed.
- 1976 – Trolleybuses begin operating.
- 1979 – Supermercados Gigante (supermarket) opens.
- 1983 – Sister city relationship established with Portland, Oregon, USA.
- 1986 – Guadalajara International Film Festival begins.
- 1987 – Guadalajara International Book Fair begins.
- 1988
  - Guadalajara Zoo opens.
  - Festival Cultural de Mayo begins.
- 1989 – Guadalajara light rail system begins operating.
- 1990 – Population: 1,650,042.
- 1991 – XHGJG-TV begins broadcasting.
- 1992 – April 22: Gasoline explosions in Analco.
- 1994 – Encuentro del Mariachi begins.
- 1996 – Guadalajara Gay Pride inaugurated.
- 1997 – December: "Freak snowfall."
- 1998 – Francisco Javier Ramírez Acuña becomes mayor.

== 21st century ==
- 2002 – Oficina para Proyectos de Arte (art space) founded.
- 2004 – EU-Latin American-Caribbean summit held; prompts protest.
- 2005 – City designated an American Capital of Culture.
- 2007
  - Pan American Volleyball Complex opens.
  - Alfonso Petersen becomes mayor.
- 2008 – Nissan Gymnastics Stadium opens.
- 2009
  - Guadalajara Macrobús begins operating.
  - Jorge Aristóteles Sandoval Díaz elected mayor.
- 2010
  - Telcel Tennis Complex and Pan American Hockey Stadium open.
  - Population: 1,495,182.
- 2011 – October: 2011 Pan American Games held.
- 2012
  - May: Peace march.
  - Ramiro Hernández García becomes Municipal President.

== See also ==
- Guadalajara history
- History of Guadalajara
- List of mayors of Guadalajara
- History of Jalisco (state)

== Bibliography ==
=== In English ===
Published in the 19th century

- Jedidiah Morse; Richard C. Morse (1823), "Guadalaxara, city", A New Universal Gazetteer (4th ed.), New Haven: S. Converse
- Albert S. Evans (1870), "Guadalajara", Our sister republic: a gala trip through tropical Mexico in 1869–70, Hartford, Connecticut: Columbian Book Co.
- John Lewis Geiger (1874), "Guadalajara", A peep at Mexico: narrative of a journey across the republic from the Pacific of the Gulf in December 1873 and January 1874, London: Trübner & Co.
- Alfred Ronald Conkling (1893), "Guadalajara", Appletons' Guide to Mexico, New York: D. Appleton & Company
- "Guadalajara", Vamos á México, Chicago: Southern Pacific Company, 1896
- Cristóbal Hidalgo (1900), "Guadalajara", Guide to Mexico, San Francisco: Whitaker & Ray Co.

Published in the 20th century

- Reau Campbell (1909), "Guadalajara", Campbell's New Revised Complete Guide and Descriptive Book of Mexico, Chicago: Rogers & Smith Co., OCLC 1667015
- "Guadalajara (Mexico)" . Encyclopædia Britannica. Vol. 12 (11th ed.). 1910. p. 644.
- Eric Van Young (1979). "Urban Market and Hinterland: Guadalajara and Its Region in the Eighteenth Century". Hispanic American Historical Review. 59 (4): 593–635. doi:10.1215/00182168-59.4.593. JSTOR 2514067.
- Nikki Craske (1994). "Women and Regime Politics in Guadalajara's Low-Income Neighbourhoods". Bulletin of Latin American Research. 13 (1): 61–78. doi:10.2307/3338701. JSTOR 3338701.
- José Luis Lezama (1994). "Mexico: Guadalajara". In Gerald Michael Greenfield (ed.). Latin American Urbanization: Historical Profiles of Major Cities. Greenwood Press. ISBN 0313259372.
- John Fisher (1999), "Guadalajara", Mexico, Rough Guides (4th ed.), London, p. 166+, OL 24935876M

Published in the 21st century

- "Guadalajara Census History: 1600–1850". Guadalajara Census Project. Florida State University, Department of History. 2003.
- David Marley (2005), "Guadalajara", Historic Cities of the Americas, Santa Barbara, Calif: ABC-CLIO, p. 226+, ISBN 1576070271
- John Harner (2007). "Globalization of Food Retailing in Guadalajara, Mexico: Changes in Access Equity and Social Engagement". Journal of Latin American Geography. 6 (2): 33–53. doi:10.1353/lag.2007.0041. JSTOR 25765177. S2CID 143811175.
- Carlos Barba Solano; et al. (2013). "Mexico: Guadalajara". In Ian Shirley, Carol Neill (ed.). Asian and Pacific Cities: Development Patterns. Routledge. ISBN 9780415632041.

=== In Spanish ===
- Joaquín Romo (1888), Guadalajara: Apuntes históricos, biográficos, estadísticos y descriptivos de la capital del estado de Jalisco (in Spanish), México: I. Paz, OCLC 11440546, OL 6720017M
- Eduardo A. Gibbon (1893), Guadalajara: (La Florencia Mexicana) Vagancias Y Recuerdos (in Spanish), Guadalajara: Imp. del "Diario de Jalisco", OCLC 1703445
- José Toribio Medina (1904). La imprenta en Guadalajara de México (1793–1821) (in Spanish). Santiago de Chile: Imprenta Elzeviriana – via HathiTrust. (Annotated list of titles published in Guadalajara, arranged chronologically)
