= Cabinet of Aristóteles Sandoval =

Cabinet of former Governor of Jalisco, Aristóteles Sandoval

- Cabinet of State of Jalisco
- Date formed: 1 March 2013
- Date dissolved: 5 December 2018

People and organisations
- Governor: Aristóteles Sandoval
- Governor's history: Former Municipal president of Guadalajara (2010–2012)
- No. of ministers: 17
- Total no. of members: 23
- Member party: Institutional Revolutionary Party
- Status in legislature: Majority government (2013–2015); Divided government (2015–2018)
- Opposition party: Citizens' Movement

History
- Election: 2012 Jalisco gubernatorial election
- Legislature terms: 60th Jalisco Legislature (01/11/2012–31/10/2015); 61st Jalisco Legislature (01/11/2015–31/10/2018)
- Budgets: 2013 Total State Budget: 77,667,737,941 pesos 2014 Total State Budget: 83,836,493,000 pesos 2015 Total State Budget: 87,694,651,930 pesos 2016 Total State Budget: 90,466,084,138 pesos 2017 Total State Budget: 100,923,903,000 pesos 2018 Total State Budget: 108,309,007,000 pesos
- Advice and consent: Congress of the State of Jalisco
- Predecessor: Cabinet of Emilio González Márquez
- Successor: Cabinet of Enrique Alfaro Ramírez

Aristóteles Sandoval assumed office as Governor of the State of Jalisco on 1 March 2013, and his term ended on 5 December 2018. The governor has the authority to nominate members of his Cabinet of the State of Jalisco, as per the Ley Orgánica del Poder Ejecutivo del Estado de Jalisco, Article 4, Section V.

== Cabinet ==
Office	Holder	Term	Political party
Secretaría General de Gobierno; General Secretariat of Government	Arturo Zamora Jiménez; Roberto López Lara	01/03/2013–13/06/2014; 13/06/2014–05/12/2018	PRI; PRI
Secretaría de Planeación, Administración y Finanzas (SEPAF) Secretariat of Planning, Administration, and Finance	Ricardo Villanueva Héctor Pérez Partida	01/03/2013–19/11/2014; 19/11/2014–05/12/2018	PRI; PRI
Secretaría de Educación; Secretariat of Education	Francisco de Jesús Ayón López	01/03/2013–05/12/2018	PRI
Secretaría de Salud Secretariat of Health	Agustín González Álvarez; Antonio Cruces Mada; Alfonso Petersen	01/03/2013–19/04/2016; 19/04/2016–23/10/2017; 23/10/2017–05/12/2018	PRI; PRI; PAN
Secretaría de Infraestructura y Obra Pública Secretariat of Infrastructure and Public Works	Roberto Dávalos López; Netzahualcóyotl Ornelas Plascencia	01/03/2013–12/09/2016; 13/09/2016–05/12/2018	PRI; PRI
Secretaría de Desarrollo Económico Secretariat of Economic Development	José Palacios Jiménez	01/03/2013–05/12/2018	PRI
Secretaría de Turismo Secretariat of Tourism	José de Jesús Gallegos Álvarez (Note: Was assassinated in Guadalajara); Enrique Ramos Flores	01/03/2013–09/03/2013; 15/03/2013–05/12/2018	PRI; PRI
Secretaría de Desarrollo Rural Secretariat of Rural Development	Héctor Padilla Gutiérrez	01/03/2013–05/12/2018	PRI
Secretaría de Medio Ambiente y Desarrollo Territorial Secretariat of Environment and Territorial Development	Magdalena Ruiz Mejía	01/03/2013–05/12/2018	PRI
Secretaría de Desarrollo e Integración Social Secretariat of Development and Social Integration	Salvador Rizo Castelo; Miguel Castro Reynoso; Daviel Trujillo Cuevas	01/03/2013–27/07/2015; 27/07/2015–06/12/2017; 06/12/2017–05/12/2018	PRI; PRI; PRI
Secretaría de Innovación, Ciencia y Tecnología Secretariat of Innovation, Science and Technology	Jaime Reyes Robles	01/03/2013–05/12/2018	PRI
Secretaría de Cultura Secretariat of Culture	Myriam Vachez Plagnol	01/03/2013–05/12/2018	PRI
Secretaría de Trabajo y Previsión Social Secretariat of Labor and Social Prevision	Eduardo Almaguer Ramírez; Héctor Pizano Ramos; Hugo Córdova Díaz (in charge of office); Tomás Figueroa Padilla; Luis Rafael Montes de Oca (in charge of office); Luis Carlos Nájera Gutiérrez de Velasco; Elke Tepper García	01/03/2013–10/07/2015; 30/07/2015–20/03/2017; 20/03/2017–05/04/2017; 05/04/2017–15/01/2018; 15/02/2018–20/02/2018; 20/02/2018–31/05/2018; 08/06/2018–05/12/2018	PRI; PRI; PRI; PRI; PRI; Unaffiliated; PRI
Secretaría de Movilidad Secretariat of Mobility	Mauricio Gudiño Coronado; Servando Sepúlveda Enríquez	01/03/2013–27/07/2015; 27/07/2015–05/12/2018	PRI; PRI
Fiscalía General del Estado State Attorney General's Office	Luis Carlos Nájera Gutiérrez de Velasco; Eduardo Almaguer; Raúl Sánchez Jiménez	01/03/2013–06/07/2015; 10/07/2015–13/11/2017; 14/11/2017–05/12/2018	Unaffiliated; PRI; PRI
Procuraduría Social Social Attorney	Felícitas Velázquez Serrano; Óscar Carlos Trejo Herrera; Consuelo del Rosario González Jiménez	01/03/2013–04/11/2015; 04/11/2015–28/09/2017; 11/10/2017–05/12/2018	PRI; PRI; PRI
Contraloría del Estado Comptrollership of the State	Juan José Bañuelos Guardado; María Teresa Brito Serrano	01/03/2013–26/04/2016; 26/04/2016–05/12/2018	PRI; Unaffiliated
Coordinación General de Dependencias Auxiliares (Jefatura del Gabinete) General Coordination of Auxiliary Dependencies (Chief of the Cabinet)	Alberto Lamas Flores; Enrique Dau Flores; Netzahualcóyotl Ornelas Plascencia; Rafael González Pimienta	01/03/2013–24/03/2015; 24/03/2015–10/06/2015; 30/07/2015–13/09/2016; 13/09/2016–05/12/2018	PRI; PRI; PRI; PRI
Consejería del Ejecutivo Executive Counseling	Enrique Dau Flores	01/03/2013–24/03/2015	PRI
Instituto Jalisciense de Asistencia Social (IJAS) Jaliscan Institute of Social Assistance	Gabriel González Delgadillo	21/03/2013–05/12/2018	PRI
Dirección de Comunicación Social Social Communication Department	Gonzalo Sánchez García	01/03/2013–05/12/2018	PRI
Secretario Particular Particular Secretary	Netzahualcóyotl Ornelas Plascencia; Giovanni Joaquín Rivera Pérez	01/03/2013–30/07/2015; 30/07/2015–05/12/2018	PRI
Secretario Privado Private Secretary	Manuel Alfaro Lozano	01/03/2013–05/12/2018	PRI
Responsable del Sistema DIF Jalisco Head of the Jalisco DIF System	Consuelo del Rosario González Jiménez	01/03/2013–10/10/2017	PRI
