= Francisco Ramírez Acuña =

Mexican politician

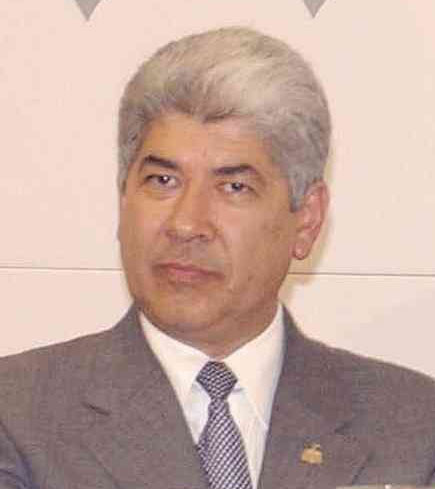

Senator for Jalisco
- Incumbent
- Assumed office September 2024

Ambassador of Mexico in Spain and Andorra
- In office April 2012 – 15 October 2013
- Preceded by: Jorge Zermeño Infante
- Succeeded by: Francisca Méndez Escobar

Member of the Chamber of Deputies 61st Congress Jalisco's 10th district
- In office 2009–2012

Secretary of the Interior of Mexico
- In office 1 December 2006 – 16 January 2008
- President: Felipe Calderón
- Preceded by: Carlos Abascal
- Succeeded by: Juan Camilo Mouriño

Governor of Jalisco
- In office 1 March 2001 – 20 November 2006
- Preceded by: Alberto Cárdenas Jiménez
- Succeeded by: Gerardo Octavio Solís Gómez

Municipal president of Guadalajara
- In office 1998–2000
- Preceded by: César Coll Carabias
- Succeeded by: Héctor Pérez Plazola

Personal details
- Born: 22 April 1952 (age 74) Jamay, Jalisco
- Party: National Action Party
- Education: University of Guadalajara
- Profession: Politician

Francisco Javier Ramírez Acuña (Note: In this Spanish name, the first or paternal surname is Ramírez and the second or maternal family name is Acuña.) (born 22 April 1952) is a Mexican politician who belongs to the National Action Party (PAN). He has been municipal president of Guadalajara, governor of Jalisco from 2001 to 2006 and, from 1 December 2006, to January 2008 he served as secretary of the interior in the cabinet of President Felipe Calderón. Since 2024 he sits in the Senate for the state of Jalisco.

== Political career ==
Francisco Ramírez Acuña was born in Jamay, Jalisco, in 1952. He studied at University of Guadalajara, joined the PAN in 1969, and has been a youth leader, member of the state committee, candidate for federal office, and an aide to the municipal president of Zapopan.

He has served two terms in the Congress of Jalisco, and upon joining the government of Jalisco, Governor Alberto Cárdenas Jiménez named him director of the SISTECOZOME, the corporation of collective PAN to mayor of Guadalajara, where he was victorious and held office from 1998 to 2000, when he left to be a candidate for governor of Jalisco.

In the 2000 elections, he competed against the candidate of the PRI, Jorge Arana Arana, winning by a small margin, and was inaugurated on 1 March 2001.

During his time in office as a very unpopular governor of Jalisco, the summit of heads of state and of government of Latin America, the Caribbean and the European Union took place in Guadalajara, in May 2004. During the summit, violent demonstrations of groups - altermundistas - occurred in Guadalajara. The destruction of urban property and business took place, including paint splattered in the oldest colonial temples of the city. In response to these attacks against the summit, the police, responding with riot teams, repressed these demonstrations. According to several versions of the event, there were violations of human rights, which have been accused by Amnesty International and by the National Human Rights Commission (which is linked - according to some, among them business interests - with antagonistic political groups and the secretary of government). The governor of Jalisco was accused of making decisions that resulted in unwarranted arrests, wounds, and cases of torture against the participants in the demonstrations: "They only took into account the statements in support of globalization, without listening to the motives of the public security forces", assured Ramírez Acuña.

The top organizations from the private sector celebrated Acuña's appointment as Secretary of the Interior.

They requested that he be permitted to leave office from the governorship of Jalisco three months before finishing his term, so as to be appointed secretary of the interior by newly elected president Felipe Calderón Hinojosa. This was one of Calderón's most controversial cabinet appointments, due to the previously mentioned incident, and also others that had taken place, such as the rejection by the Institutional Revolutionary Party of its appointment to Secretary of Government, and alleged interference in the electoral process by attacking opposing candidates.

According to Javier Oliva, the representative of the PRI before the IFE, Francisco Ramírez Acuña, "accused the candidate of the PRI in Jalisco, Arturo Zamora Jiménez (who was opposed to Acuña, and a friend of the Secretary of Government), of crimes", in the 2006 elections. Among those promoting the accusations of former candidate Arturo Zamora Jiménez were those alienated by former governor Ramírez Acuña, as the national leader of his party, who did not ask him its opinion and regarding the negative campaign (fits to emphasize was given in the two main edicts this behavior)

On 16 January 2008, Ramírez Acuña resigned as secretary of the interior.

In September 2009 he took office as a deputy in the 61st federal legislature, representing Jalisco's 10th district, where he remained until February 2012.

On 25 April 2012, the Senate appointed him ambassador to Spain and Andorra.

Ramírez Acuña won election as one of Jalisco's senators in the 2024 Senate election, occupying the first place on the Fuerza y Corazón por México coalition's two-name formula.

== See also ==
- Governor of Jalisco
- List of mayors of Guadalajara

| Preceded by Carlos Abascal | Secretary of the Interior; 2006–2008 | Succeeded by Juan Camilo Mouriño Terrazo |
| Preceded by Alberto Cárdenas | Governor of Jalisco; 2001–2006 | Succeeded by Gerardo Octavio Solís Gómez |
