= Enrique Ibarra Pedroza =

Mexican politician (born 1952)

Juan Enrique Ibarra Pedroza (born August 16, 1952) is a Mexican politician who ran as the Party of the Democratic Revolution (PRD) candidate in the 2006 Jalisco gubernatorial election.

Ibarra was born in Tototlán, Jalisco, in 1952. He holds a bachelor's degree in law from the Universidad de Guadalajara (UdeG). He was an active member of the Institutional Revolutionary Party (PRI) in his native Jalisco; he served as local deputy in the Congress of Jalisco from 1983 to 1986 and from 1992 to 1995. He also served in the federal Chamber of Deputies for Jalisco's 7th district in 1988–1991.

In November 2005, he resigned from the PRI because he wanted to run for governor since 1996 so he changed to the PRD and they make him the PRD candidate in Jalisco. He lost the election in third place against the National Action Party (PAN) candidate, Emilio González Márquez.

== See also ==
- 2006 Jalisco state election
