= Gerardo Solís Gómez =

Mexican politician (born 1957)

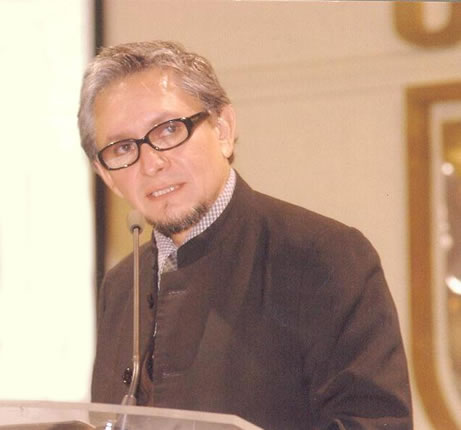
Gerardo Solís in 2013

Gerardo Octavio Solís Gómez (born November 19, 1957, in Guadalajara, Jalisco) is a Mexican politician, member of the National Action Party who has served as substitute Governor of Jalisco.

== Biography ==
Solís Gómez served in the cabinet of Francisco Javier Ramírez Acuña as Secretary General of Government. The Congress of Jalisco designated him substitute Governor of Jalisco when Ramírez Acuña left that position to serve in the cabinet of Felipe Calderón.

Solís took office as Governor on November 21, 2006.

Preceded by Francisco Javier Ramírez Acuña	Governor of Jalisco; 2006-2007	Succeeded by Emilio González Márquez
