= Gabriel Covarrubias Ibarra =

Mexican politician (1930–2018)

Member of the Senate for Jalisco
- In office 1 November 1997 – 31 August 2000

Member of the Congress of Jalisco
- In office 15 March 1995 – 1997

Municipal president of Guadalajara
- In office 1 January 1989 – 30 March 1992
- Preceded by: Eugenio Ruiz Orozco
- Succeeded by: Enrique Dau Flores

Personal details
- Born: July 3, 1930 Guadalajara, Jalisco, Mexico
- Died: August 2, 2018 (aged 88) Guadalajara, Jalisco, Mexico
- Party: PRI

Gabriel Covarrubias Ibarra (3 July 1930 – 2 August 2018) was a Mexican politician and a member of the Institutional Revolutionary Party (PRI).

Covarrubias was a public accountant by profession and worked for the state treasury before entering politics. He served as municipal president of Guadalajara from 1989 to 1992. As municipal president, he make his own count of inhabitants after disagreeing with the figures from the INEGI. Covarrubias led the filing of a legal appeal against the electricity tariffs of the CFE. He also received recognition for refusing to grant authorization for a gay pride parade. He also served as president of the board of reconstruction after the explosions of 22 April 1992. He was elected as a member of the LIV Legislature of the Congress of Jalisco.

He was a Senator from 1997 to 2000, serving on a number of commissions including Industrial Development, Agriculture, Livestock and Rural Development, and Treasury and Credit.

Covarrubias died on 2 August 2018 in Guadalajara.
