= Midwest Unrest =

Midwest Unrest was a small collective in Chicago formed by anarchists and anti-capitalists in a planning meeting for that city's mobilization to the protests against the Free Trade Area of the Americas summit in Miami in November 2003. Midwest Unrest organized a pre-mobilization consulta, and took part in the week of protests that was met with a style of repression now often referred to as the Miami model. It then organized a protest locally against the Central American Free Trade Agreement that December, and became something of a fixture of citywide and anti-fascist protests in Chicago. Additionally, as a result of connections made via the anti-FTAA consulta, it attempted to formalize networking with similar groups regionally.

The collective experienced internal conflict the next August over allegations of rape that were leveled against one of its members, who was then expelled from the group.

More recently, the Midwest Unrest collective participated in a citywide campaign to prevent threatened service cuts and fare increases by the Chicago Transit Authority. Through aggressive agitation in public hearings, meetings and flyering, the group pushed the Fare Strike tactic set for December 15 of 2004. The CTA postponed its decision for six months in what many community groups in the city heralded as a victory.

As of 2006, the Midwest Unrest collective has disbanded.
