= Verónica Delgadillo =

Mexican politician (born 1982)

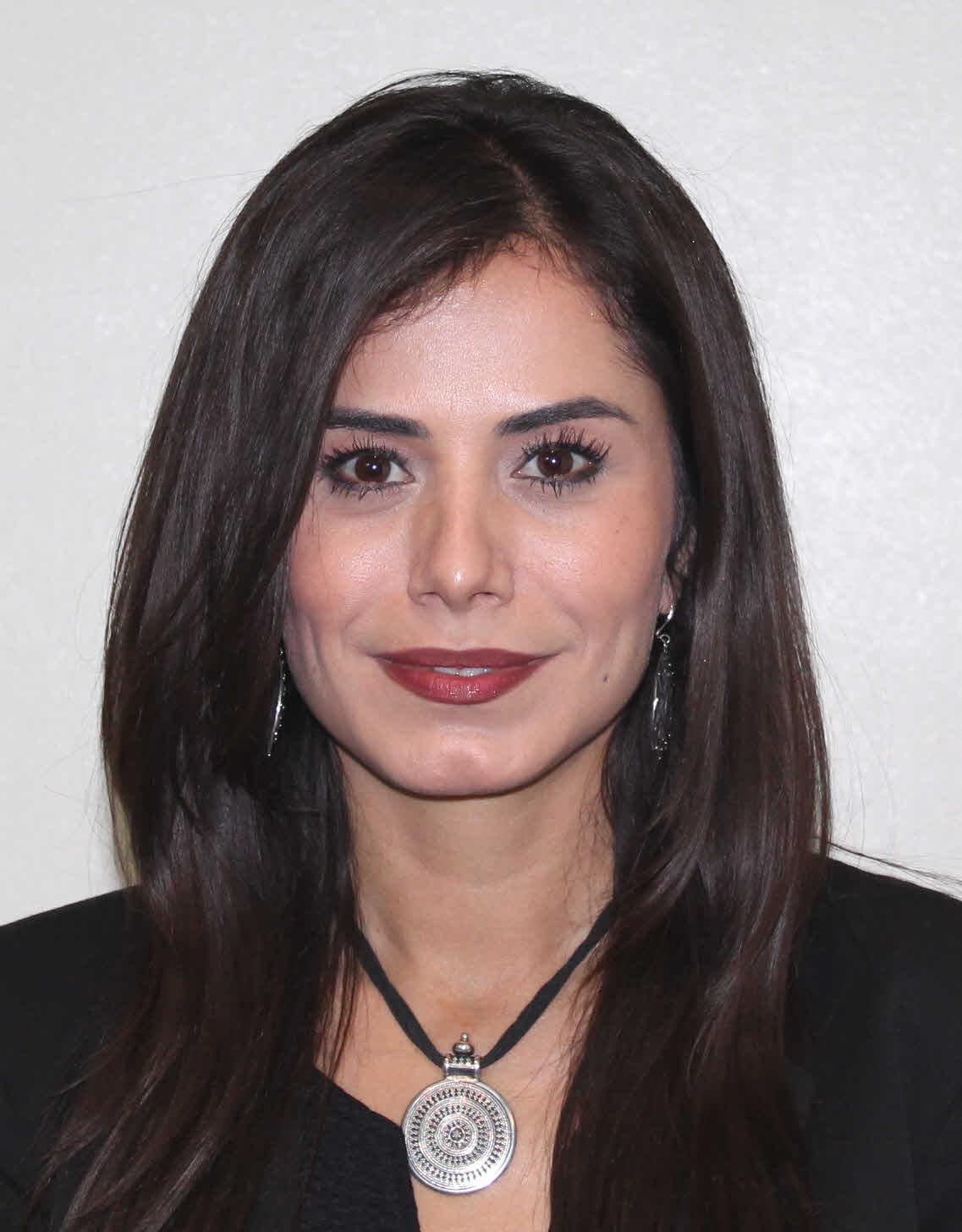
- Delgadillo in 2018

Mayor of Guadalajara
- Incumbent
- Assumed office 1 October 2024
- Preceded by: Francisco Ramírez Salcido

Personal details
- Born: 13 November 1982 (age 43) Guadalajara, Jalisco, Mexico
- Party: Citizens' Movement

Verónica Delgadillo García (born 13 November 1982) is a Mexican politician from the Citizens' Movement party (MC) serving as mayor of Guadalajara, Jalisco, since 2024.

Delgadillo García is a native of Guadalajara. She holds a bachelor's degree in communication science from the Monterrey Institute of Technology and Higher Education (ITESM).

From 2012 to 2015, she was a member of the Congress of Jalisco and, from 2015 to 2017, she was a member of the Chamber of Deputies, representing Jalisco's 8th district. In the 2018 general election she was elected to a six-year term in the Senate for the state of Jalisco.

In the 2024 local elections she was elected to serve as municipal president of Guadalajara. She is the first woman to hold the position in the city's history.
