= Gabriel Jiménez Remus =

Mexican politician (1940–2016)

Ambassador of Mexico to Cuba
- In office September 27, 2007 – 2013
- President: Felipe Calderón
- Preceded by: José Ignacio Piña Rojas
- Succeeded by: Juan José Bremer

Ambassador of Mexico to Spain and Andorra
- In office February 15, 2001 – February 28, 2007
- President: Vicente Fox (2001–2006); Felipe Calderón (2006–2007)
- Preceded by: Juan José Bremer
- Succeeded by: Jorge Zermeño Infante

Member of the Senate of the Republic
- In office November 1, 1994 – August 31, 2000
- Preceded by: Elected position created
- Succeeded by: Óscar Gómez Flores

Personal details
- Born: Enrique Gabriel Jiménez Remus; March 23, 1940 Guadalajara, Jalisco, Mexico
- Died: December 30, 2016 (aged 76) Guadalajara, Jalisco, Mexico
- Party: National Action Party
- Education: National Autonomous University of Mexico

Enrique Gabriel Jiménez Remus (March 23, 1940 – December 30, 2016) was a Mexican diplomat, lawyer, politician and member of the National Action Party (PAN). Jimenez served in the Senate of the Republic from 1994 to 2000. He was then appointed as Mexico's Ambassador to Spain and Andorra from 2001 to 2007, as well as Ambassador to Cuba from 2007 until 2013.

Jiménez was born in Guadalajara, Jalisco, on March 23, 1940. He received his law degree from National Autonomous University of Mexico (UNAM). He worked as a lawyer for Celanese Mexicana and the Mexican division of Nestlé, headquartered in Ocotlán, during his legal career.

Jiménez joined the opposition National Action Party (PAN) in 1979, at a time when the ruling Institutional Revolutionary Party (PRI) dominated Mexican politics. He ran unsuccessfully for Governor of Jalisco in 1982, but lost to the PRI candidate. He then served in the state Congress of Jalisco from 1988 to 1991. He was then elected to the national Senate from 1994 to 2000, where he also served as the PAN parliamentary coordinator.

Jiménez was appointed Ambassador to Spain from 2001 to 2007. He then served as Ambassador to neighboring Cuba from 2007 to 2013.

Gabriel Jiménez Remus died at a private hospital in Guadalajara on December 28, 2016, at the age of 76.
