= Fare strike =

Fare evasion as a form of protest

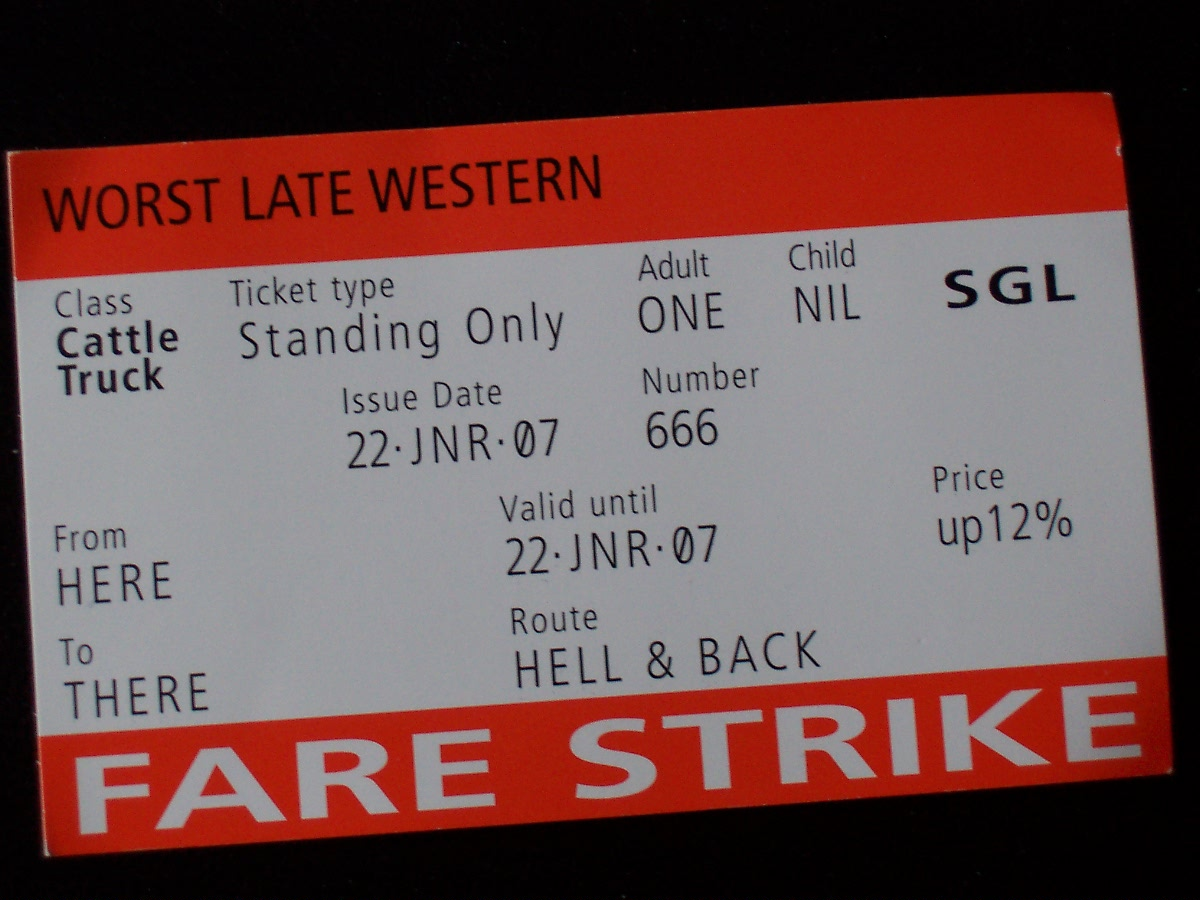
Fare strike pamphlet against British train company First Great Western

A fare strike is a direct action in which people in a city with a public transit system carry out mass fare evasion as a method of protest. Jumping turnstiles, boarding buses through the back or very quickly through the front, and leaving doors open in subway stations are some tactics used. In some cases, transit operators obstruct the fare box to prevent anyone from paying. Often, fare strikes are used to protest against fare hikes and service cuts, but they can also organize solidarity between riders and drivers.

== History ==
The first historical mention of a fare strike in the United States was in 1944 in Cleveland, Ohio when "streetcar workers threatened to refuse to collect fares in order to win a pay increase." The action was effective because "the City Council gave in before they actually used the tactic." These kinds of "social strikes," collective acts of refusal where workers continue to provide services (in this case, transit) but do not collect any money, have occurred in France and parts of Latin America.

In 1969, Italy's "Hot Autumn" was sparked at FIAT's Mirafiori plant in Turin and spilled past the factory gates as workers coordinated movements using other forms of the social strike: FIAT workers refused to pay for the trams and buses and went into stores to demand reductions in prices, backed only by showing their factory ID badges. Others squatted houses and collectively refused to pay utility bills. These kinds of struggles spread throughout Italy until the end of the 1970s.

Another type of social strike occurred during the 1970 postal strike in the United States when "letter carriers promised to deliver welfare checks even while on strike." In 2004, much like in the 1944 example in Cleveland, the Chicago group Midwest Unrest was able to organize a fare strike that forced the Chicago Transit Authority to back down on service cuts and fare increases. In 2005, at least 5,000 riders participated in the first ever fare strike in Vancouver, British Columbia, Canada.

In San Francisco, in 2005, "Despite heavy police presence at major bus transfer points, at least a couple thousand passengers rode the buses for free in San Francisco on Thursday, September 1st - the opening day of a fare strike in North America's most bus-intensive city." Two of the main groups involved in organizing this were Muni Social Strike and Muni Fare Strike. Other community groups also participated, including the Chinese Progressive Association and "the one major extension of the strike, through the participation of the day laborers' organization in organizing among Spanish-speaking immigrants" working class in San Francisco's Mission District, where the strike was most successful.

In Montreal, striking students in 2005 often used the subway as a means of transportation during demonstrations. As a group, the demonstration would enter the subway without paying, usually while chanting "Métro populaire."

In New York City, Occupy Wall Street activists chained and taped open service gates and turnstiles to the subway system to protest "escalating service cuts, fare hikes, racist policing, assaults on transit workers' working conditions and livelihoods — and the profiteering of the super-rich by way of a system they've rigged in their favor" on March 28, 2012.

In Grand Rapids, in 2016, a coalition of community activists boarded numerous city buses and refused to pay; part of a "Day of Action" against The Rapid, which culminated in a sit-in aimed at disrupting a scheduled board of directors meeting later that same day. The activists were protesting the board's refusal to negotiate a contract settlement with the workers of Amalgamated Transit Union Local 836, violations of those workers' First Amendment rights, a 16% fare hike, and a raise given to CEO, Peter Varga, while these perceived attacks on workers and riders were taking place. This was the first fare strike in Michigan history.

In Okayama, Japan, a fare collection strike took place at Ryobi Bus in 2018.

== See also ==
- Protest
- Demonstration (people)
- Social action
