= List of demonstrations against corporate globalization =

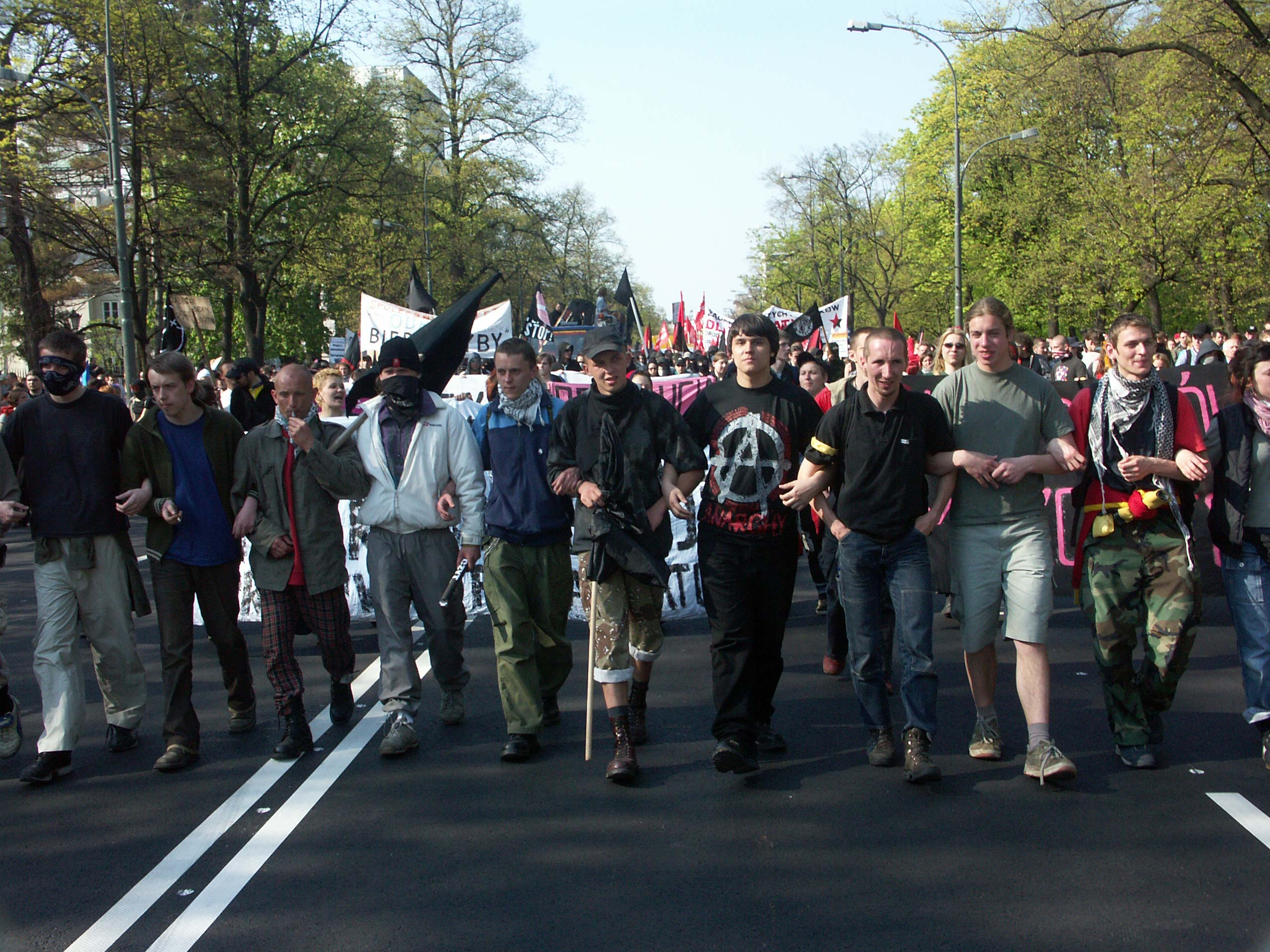
Demonstration in Warsaw against the 2004 World Economic Forum

This article lists significant demonstrations by the anti-globalization movement against corporate globalization since 1999, including the convergence of anti-globalization actions with opposition to the United States-led Iraq War beginning in 2003 and continuing through the end of George W. Bush's presidency in 2009. The list also includes actions related to the Occupy movement against worldwide economic inequality, which began with Occupy Wall Street in 2011.

== 1999 ==
- June 18, 1999 – Carnival against Capitalism worldwide, including London, England / Eugene, US / Cologne, Germany, J18 or Global Action Day protests.
- November 30, 1999 – 100,000 protest in Seattle, against the World Trade Organization Third Ministerial conference, also known as the 'Battle of Seattle' or 'N30'.

== 2000 ==
- January 27, 2000 – Clashes in Davos, Switzerland, ahead of the World Economic Forum.
- April 16, 2000 – Washington A16, 2000, Washington, D.C., International Monetary Fund (IMF) and World Bank.
- May 1, 2000 – Global May Day protests in London, Berlin, and other cities.
- June 4, 2000 – Protests against the Organization of American States in Windsor, Ontario.
- June 13, 2000 – Protests during the week-long 16th World Petroleum Congress in Calgary, Alberta.
- July 6, 2000 – 'R2K' mass protests at the Republican National Convention in Philadelphia.
- August 11, 2000 – Clashes in Los Angeles, during the Democratic National Convention.
- September 11, 2000 – S11 protests against the World Economic Forum in Melbourne, Australia.
- September 26, 2000 – Protests in Prague, Czech Republic, against the World Bank/IMF.
- November 20, 2000 – Montreal, Quebec, G20 meeting.
- December 7, 2000 – Protests at ASEAN Summit in Bangkok, Thailand.

== 2001 ==
- January 20, 2001 – Washington, D.C., Mass protests against Bush's inauguration ceremony.
- January 27, 2001 – Clashes in Davos, Switzerland, at World Economic Forum.
- March 17, 2001 – Clashes in Naples, Italy, during the Global Forum.
- April 20, 2001 – 20,000 protest and clash with police at 'A20,' the 3rd Summit of the Americas (FTAA) in Quebec City, Canada.
- May 1, 2001 – Global May Day protests in London, Berlin, Sydney, and other cities.
- June 15, 2001 – Riots in Kraków, Poland at EU Summit; three protestors shot by police, 1130 arrests.
- June 25, 2001 – Protests in Barcelona, Spain during World Bank summit.
- July 1, 2001 – Salzburg, Austria World Economic Forum.
- July 20, 2001 – 250,000 protest in Genoa, Italy against the G8 summit. A protester Carlo Giuliani, was shot dead by police.
- September 29, 2001 – Kuala Lumpur, Malaysia, Anti-ASEAN protests.

== 2002 ==
- February 1, 2002 – New York City, US / Porto Alegre, Brazil World Economic Forum / World Social Forum.
- March 15, 2002 – Stockholm, Sweden EU Summit.
- April 20, 2002 – Washington, DC (war on terrorism).
- May 1, 2002 – Global May Day protests.
- June 14–18; Cities for People protests against U.S. Conference of Mayors
- June 24, 2002 – World Bank Oslo 2002 Protests.
- June 26, 2002 – Calgary, Alberta, and Ottawa, Ontario, G8 summit at Kananaskis, Alberta J26 G8 Protests.
- September 27, 2002 – Washington, D.C., IMF/World Bank.
- November 4 to 10, 2002 – Phnom Penh, Cambodia, Anti-ASEAN protests.

== 2003 ==
- May 1, 2003 – Global May Day protests.
- May 29 – June 3, 2003 – Mass protests in Evian, Geneva, and Lausanne, Switzerland against the G8 summit.
- June 26, 2003 – Clashes in Odense, Denmark, during EU Summit.
- July 27 - 30, 2003 – Montreal, Quebec. Protests against the World Trade Organisation, which held preliminary talks in Montreal ahead of their September 2003 meeting in Cancún.
- September 14, 2003 – Fifth Ministerial of the WTO in Cancún, Mexico collapses.
- October 2003 – regional WEF meeting in Dublin, European Competitiveness Summit, cancelled.
- November 2003 – Paris European Social Forum.
- November 20, 2003 – large Miami Mobilization against the FTAA; notable for first full implementation of law enforcement 'Miami Model' tactics.

== 2004 ==
- April 29, 2004 – 3,000 trade unionists, laid-off miners, and leftist youths protest in Warsaw, Poland, during the European Economic Forum.
- May 1, 2004 – Global May Day protests.
- May 28, 2004 – Guadalajara, Mexico, Summit of Heads of State and Governments from Latin America, the Caribbean and the European Union.
- August 29–31, 2004 – Large protests against the 2004 Republican National Convention and President Bush in New York City.
- November 19–21, 2004 – Before and during the APEC Chile 2004 summit in Santiago, Chile, several thousand demonstrators, ranging from human rights advocates to indigenous activists to feminists, protested President Bush, the Iraq War, and globalization.

== 2005 ==
- January 20, 2005 – Counter-inaugural protest in Washington, D.C. during the second inauguration of U.S. President George W. Bush.
- May 1, 2005 – Global May Day protests.
- July 2 to 8, 2005 – Mass protests in Edinburgh, Stirling, and Gleneagles, Scotland against the G8 Summit.
- Dec 13 to 18, 2005 – Protests in Hong Kong, China, World Trade Organization Sixth Ministerial Conference.

== 2006 ==
- May 1, 2006 – Global May Day protests.
- November 18, 2006 to November 19, 2006 – G20 protests in Melbourne, Australia.

== 2007 ==
- March 9, 2007 – Clashes in Budapest, Hungary against the EU.
- March 12, 2007 – Anti-EU protests in Ghent, Belgium.
- March 14, 2007 – Clashes in Kassel against the EU.
- May 1, 2007 – Global May Day protests.
- May 29, 2007 – Clashes in Yokohama ahead of the G7 Summit.
- June 2, 2007 – 80,000 protest in Brussels ahead of the EU Summit.
- September 8, 2007 – Anti-ASEAN protests in Jakarta and Bandung, Indonesia and Hanoi, Vietnam.
- October 18, 2007 – Anti-APEC riots in Shanghai.

== 2009 ==
- March April 28 to 1, 2009 – 2009 G-20 London summit protests.
- April 1 to 5, 2009 – Anti-ASEAN protests in Manila, Vientiane and Kuching.
- April 24 to 26, 2009 – Washington, D.C., World Bank/IMF Meetings.
- September 23 to 25, 2009 – 2009 G-20 Pittsburgh summit.

== 2010 ==
- May 5 to 6, 2010 – May 2010 Greek protests.
- June 18 to 28, 2010 – 2010 G-20 Toronto summit protests.
- October 9 to 11, 2010 – Washington, D.C., World Bank/IMF Meetings.

== 2011 ==
- September 17, 2011 – Occupy Wall Street protest begins in New York City and continues for fifty-nine days before being evicted.
- September 17, 2011 – Occupy Shanghai around 100 protesters gathered in the city centre.
- October 5, 2011 – Occupy Shanghai demonstrations swelled to the largest yet with an estimated 15,000 marchers joining the protest.
- October 15, 2011 – The 15 October 2011 global protests.
- October 20, 2011 – Occupy British Columbia demonstrations.
- October 21, 2011 – Occupy Melbourne protest.
- October 22, 2011 – Occupy Tirana protest.
- October 29, 2011 – Occupy Chennai protest.
- November 12, 2011 – Occupy Buenos Aires.
- November 19, 2011 – Occupy Buffer Zone in Cyprus (also known as #OccupyBufferZ ).
- November 27, 2011 – Occupy İzmir.

== 2012 ==
- January 2, 2012 – Occupy Nigeria.
- February 20, 2012 – Mashtots Park Movement in Armenia.
- April 28, 2012 – Occupy Klárov in Prague.

== 2013 ==
- June, 2013 – G8 Summit Protests

== 2021 ==
- November 6, 2021 – COP26 protests in Glasgow.

== 2022 ==
- October 25, 2022 – G20 protests in Jakarta, Indonesia.

== 2023 ==
- November 24, 2023 – Protests against for the 'global rights' of Amazon workers and against Amazon's "corporate greed and arrogance".
- December 9, 2023 – protests for climate justice and a cease-fire in the Israel-Hamas war, at COP28 in Dubai, United Arab Emirates.

== 2024 ==
- November 11–22, 2024 – protests for climate justice at COP29 in Baku, Azerbaijan.
- February 13, 2024 – farmer protests against large corporations begin in Delhi, India.

== 2025 ==
- January 19, 2025 – Demonstrations in Davos, Switzerland during the World Economic Forum saw climate activists block the heliport and spray a corporate base with paint, calling for “Tax the super-rich” and highlighting fossil-fuel subsidy issues.
