= Jorge Zermeño Infante =

Mexican lawyer and politician

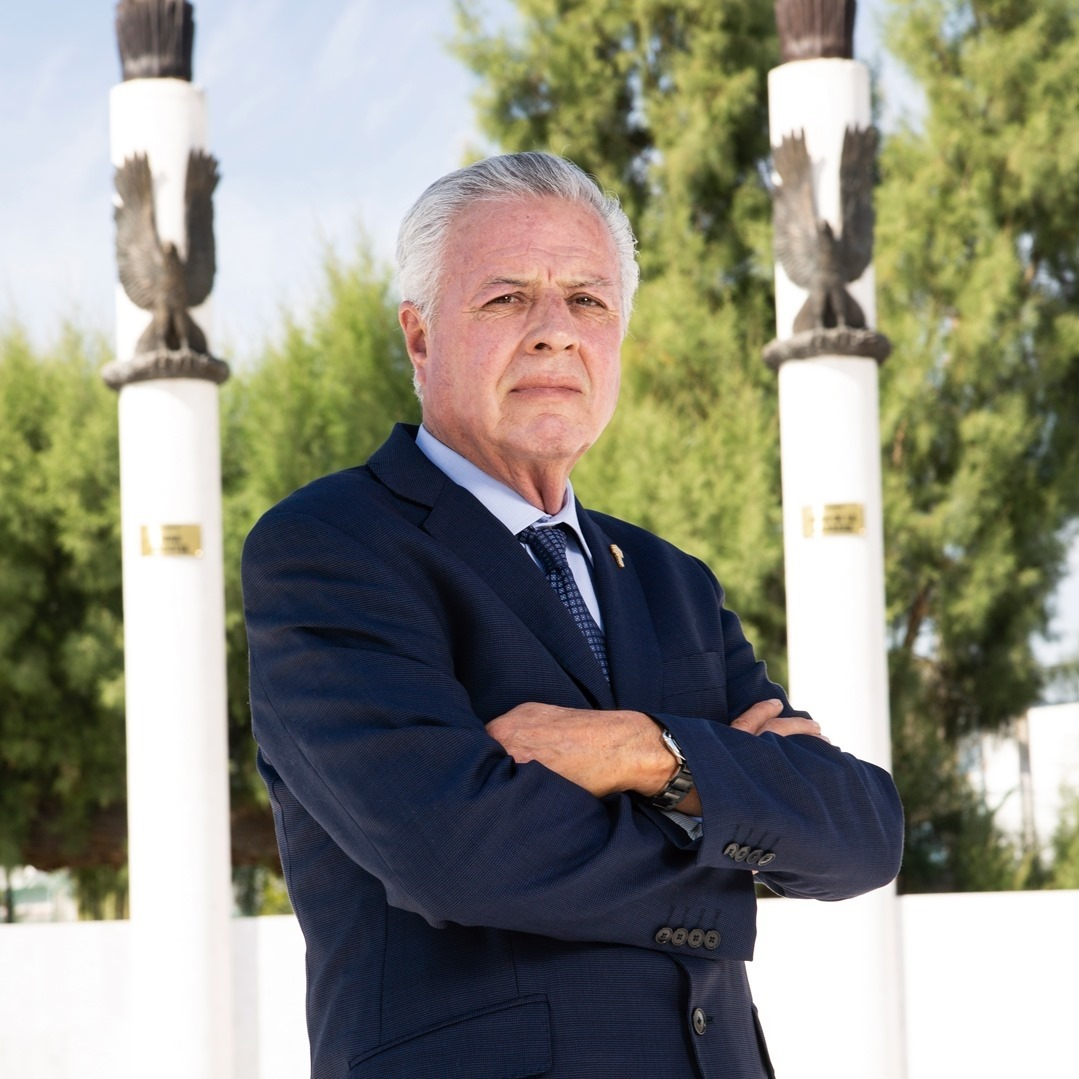

Ambassador of Mexico to Spain
- In office July 3, 2007 – December 2011
- President: Felipe Calderón
- Preceded by: Gabriel Jiménez Remus
- Succeeded by: Francisco Javier Ramírez Acuña

President of the Chamber of Deputies
- In office August 30, 2006 – June 27, 2007
- Preceded by: Álvaro Elías Loredo
- Succeeded by: María Elena Álvarez Bernal

Personal details
- Born: 23 January 1949 (age 77) Mexico City, Mexico
- Party: PAN
- Occupation: Lawyer and politician

Jorge Zermeño Infante (born 23 January 1949) is a Mexican lawyer and politician affiliated with the National Action Party. He is Mayor of Torreón (2018–2021), having previously served in this position from 1997 to 1999. From 2014 to 2017 he served as Senator of the LVIII and LIX Legislatures of the Mexican Congress representing Coahuila and as Deputy of the LX Legislature. He was the President of the Chamber of Deputies in 2006–2007.

He was also Ambassador of Mexico to Spain between 2007 and 2011.
