= Political demonstration =

Collective action supporting a cause

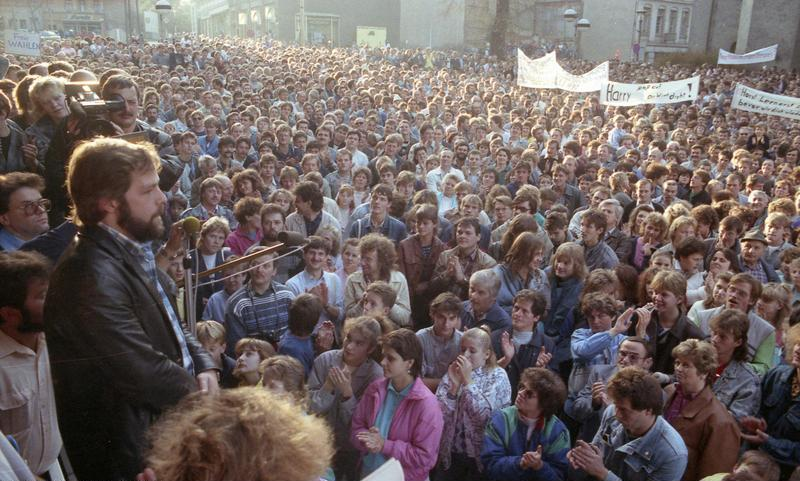
Monday demonstrations in East Germany (1989–1991) helped bring down the Berlin Wall.

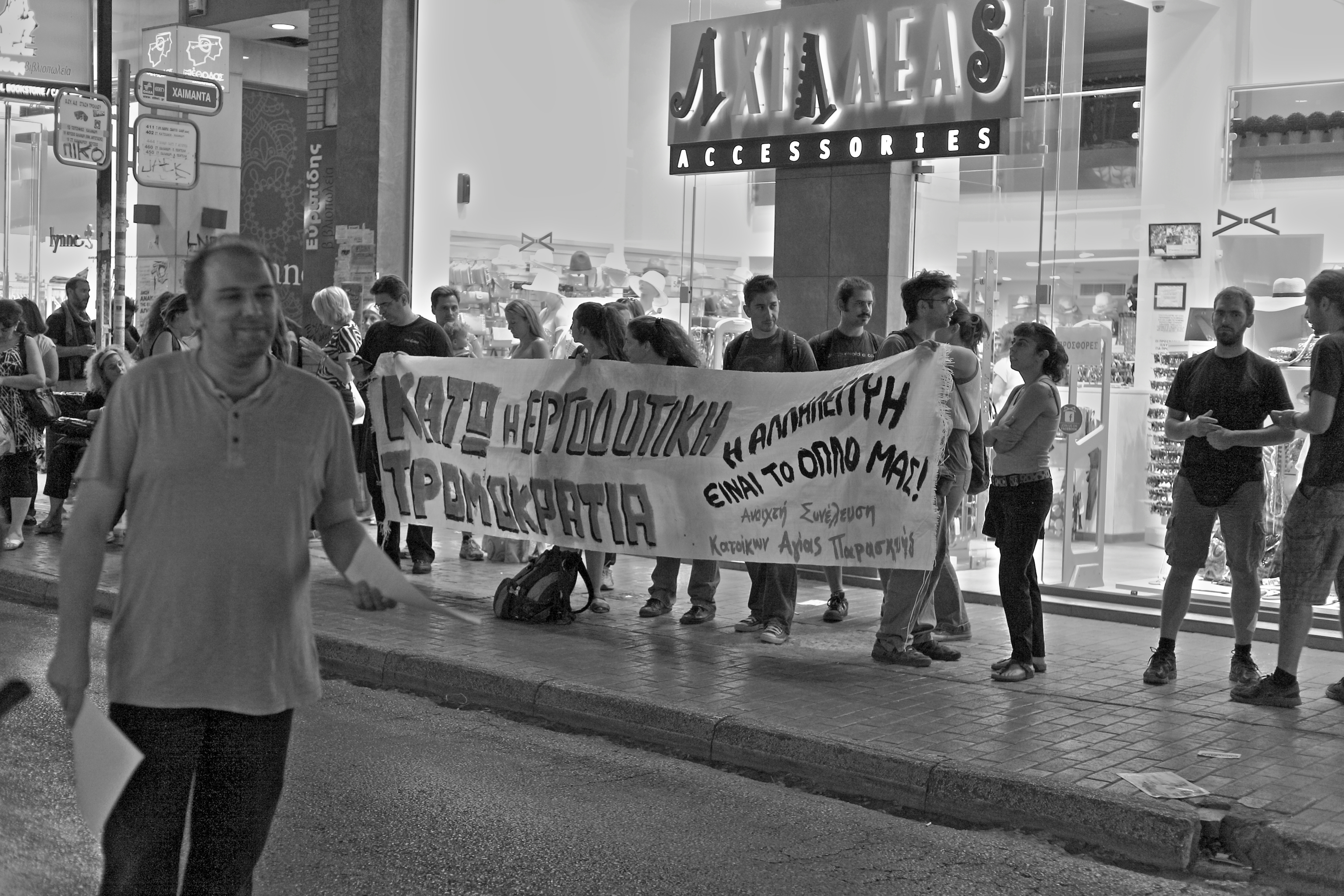
Greece, 2013: a working-class political protest calling for the boycott of a bookshop after an employee was fired, allegedly for her labor-rights political activism.

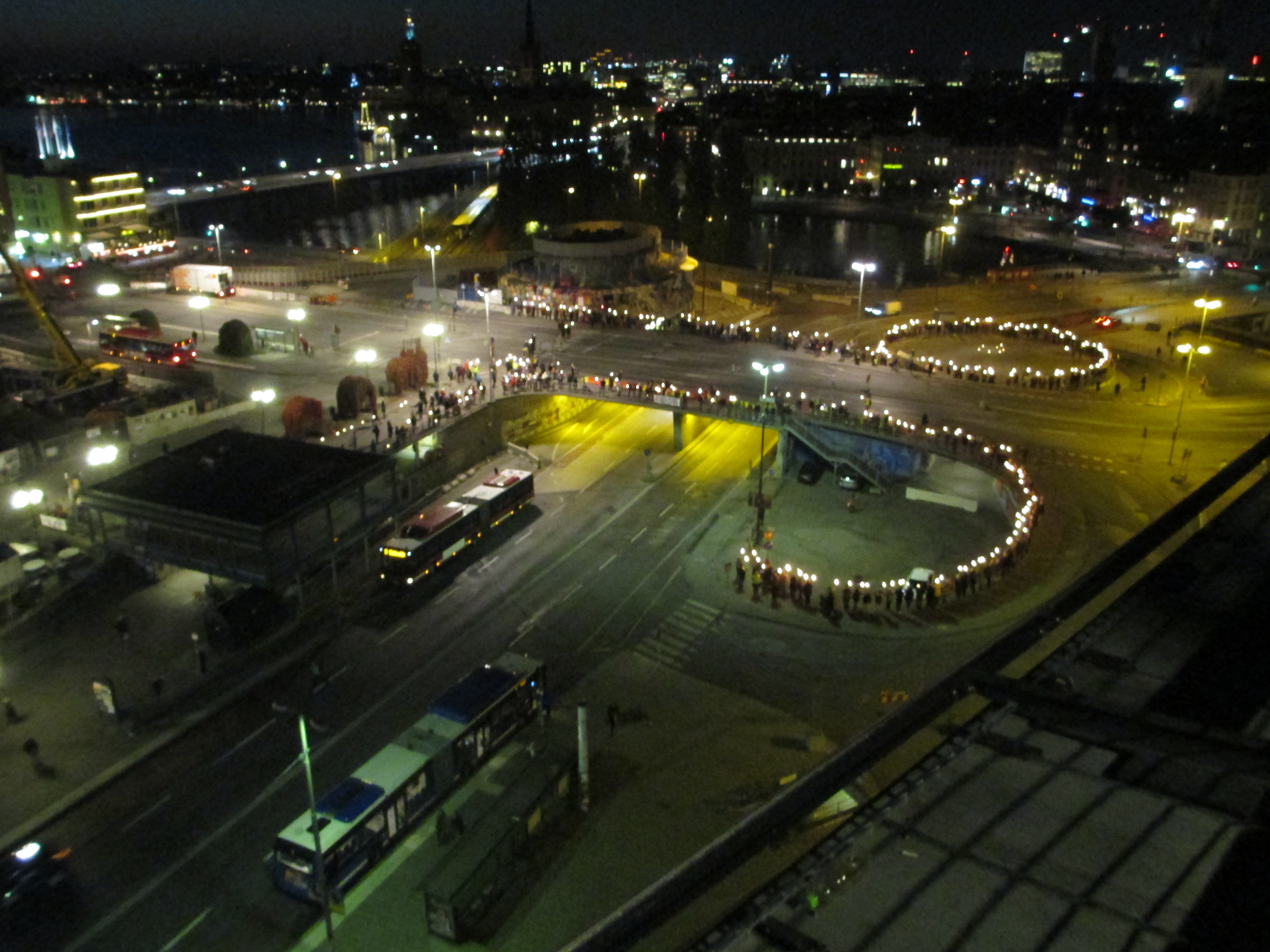
Stockholm, 2015: protesters demonstrate against the city's new drastic plans for the Slussen area and interchange.

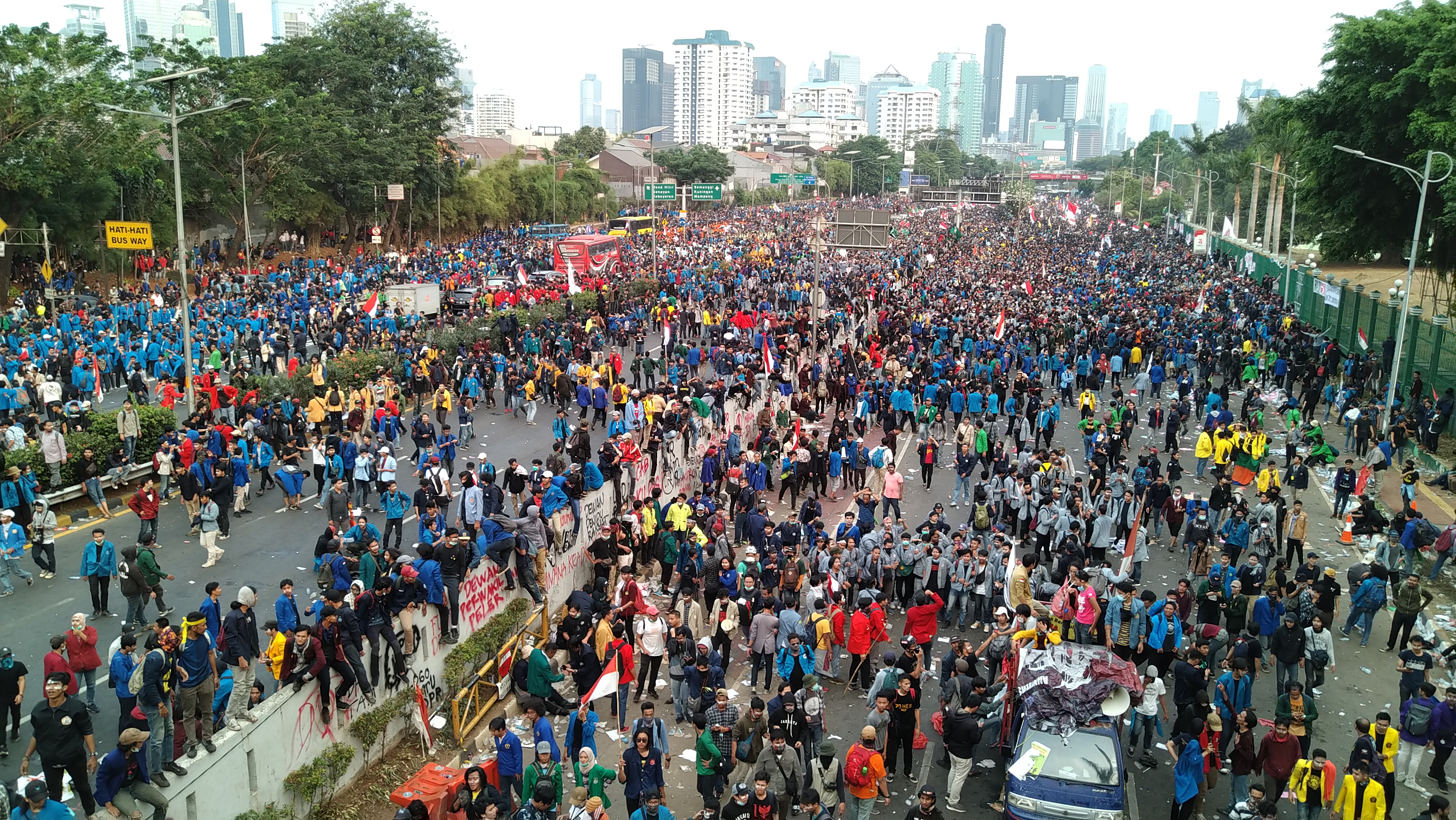
Jakarta, 2019: protesters occupying the Gatot Subroto Avenue in front of the DPR/MPR Building.

A political demonstration is an action by a mass group or collection of groups of people in favor of a political or other cause or people partaking in a protest against a cause of concern; it often consists of walking in a mass march formation and either beginning with or meeting at a designated endpoint, or rally, in order to hear speakers. It is different from mass meeting.

Demonstrations may include actions such as blockades and sit-ins. They can be either nonviolent or violent, with participants often referring to violent demonstrations as "militant." Depending on the circumstances, a demonstration may begin as nonviolent and escalate to violence. Law enforcement, such as riot police, may become involved in these situations. Police involvement at protests is ideally to protect the participants and their right to assemble. However, officers do not always fulfill this responsibility and it is well-documented that many cases of protest intervention result in power abuse. It may be to prevent clashes between rival groups, or to prevent a demonstration from spreading and turning into a riot.

== History ==
The term has been in use since the mid-19th century, as was the term "monster meeting", which was coined initially with reference to the huge assemblies of protesters inspired by Daniel O'Connell (1775–1847) in Ireland. Demonstrations are a form of activism, usually taking the form of a public gathering of people in a rally or walking in a march. Thus, the opinion is demonstrated to be significant by gathering in a crowd associated with that opinion.

Demonstrations can promote a viewpoint (either positive or negative) regarding a public issue, especially relating to a perceived grievance or social injustice. A demonstration is usually considered more successful if more people participate. Research shows that anti-government demonstrations occur more frequently in affluent countries than in poor ones.

Widely recognized political demonstrations include the Boston Tea Party, March on Washington, and the George Floyd protests. However, political demonstrations have been occurring for many centuries before these famous ones.

== Types ==
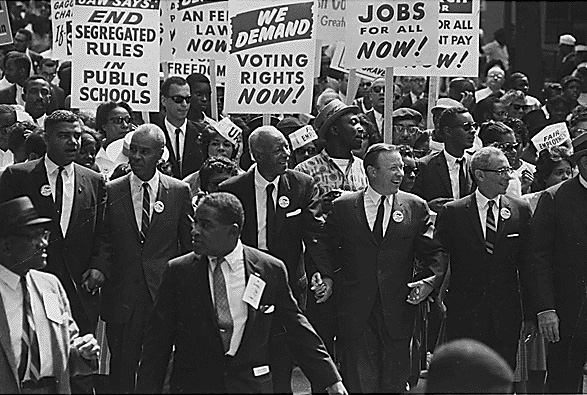
During the American Civil Rights Movement and the March on Washington, leaders marched from the Washington Monument to the Lincoln Memorial, August 28, 1963.

Video of a demonstration in Argentina to commemorate the 1976 coup d'état

There are many types of demonstrations, including a variety of elements. These may include:

- Marches, in which a parade demonstrate while moving along a set route.
- Rallies, in which people gather to listen to speakers or musicians.
- Picketing, in which people surround an area (normally an employer).
- Sit-ins, in which demonstrators occupy an area, sometimes for a stated period but sometimes indefinitely, until they feel their issue has been addressed, or they are otherwise convinced or forced to leave.
- Nudity, in which they protest naked – here the antagonist may give in before the demonstration happens to avoid embarrassment.

Demonstrations are sometimes spontaneous gatherings, but are also utilized as a tactical choice by movements. They often form part of a larger campaign of nonviolent resistance, often also called civil resistance. Demonstrations are generally staged in public, but private demonstrations are certainly possible, especially if the demonstrators wish to influence the opinions of a small or very specific group of people. Demonstrations are usually physical gatherings, but virtual or online demonstrations are certainly possible.

Topics of demonstrations often deal with political, economic, and social issues. Particularly with controversial issues, sometimes groups of people opposed to the aims of a demonstration may themselves launch a counter-demonstration with the aim of opposing the demonstrators and presenting their view. Clashes between demonstrators and counter-demonstrators may turn violent.

Government-organized demonstrations are demonstrations which are organized by a government. The Islamic Republic of Iran, the People's Republic of China, Republic of Cuba, the Soviet Union and Argentina, among other nations, have had government-organized demonstrations.

== Times and locations ==
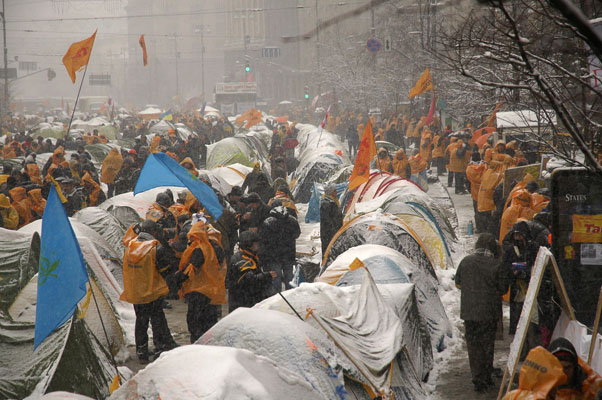
Orange Revolution demonstrations lasted so long that demonstrators set up tents.

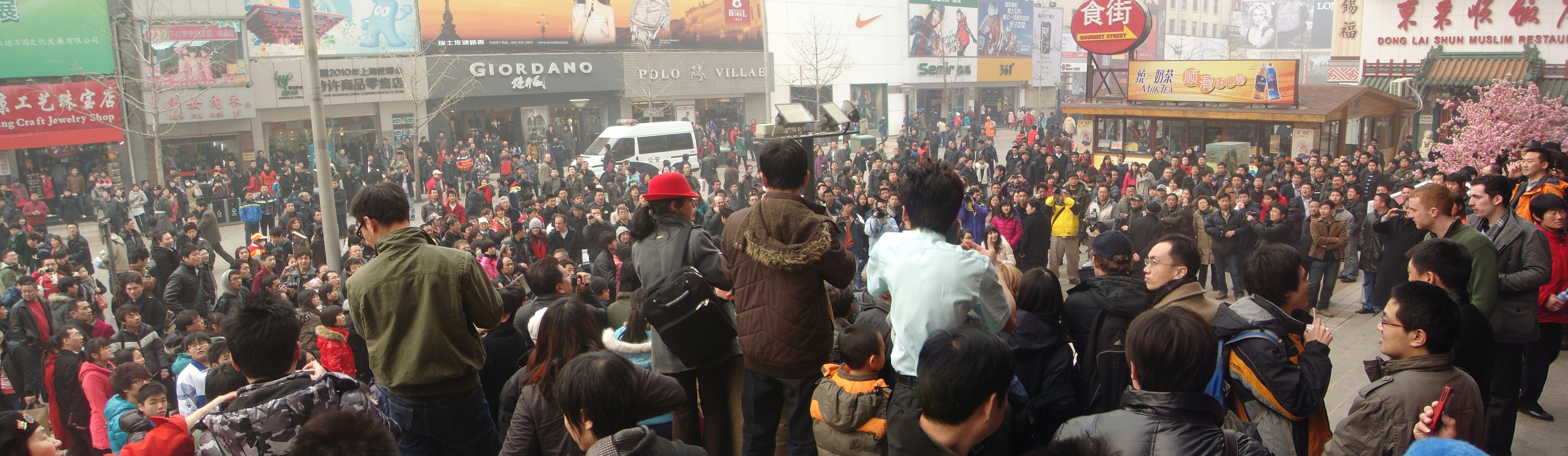
Crowd in front of a McDonald's in Wangfujing on the 2011 Chinese pro-democracy protests

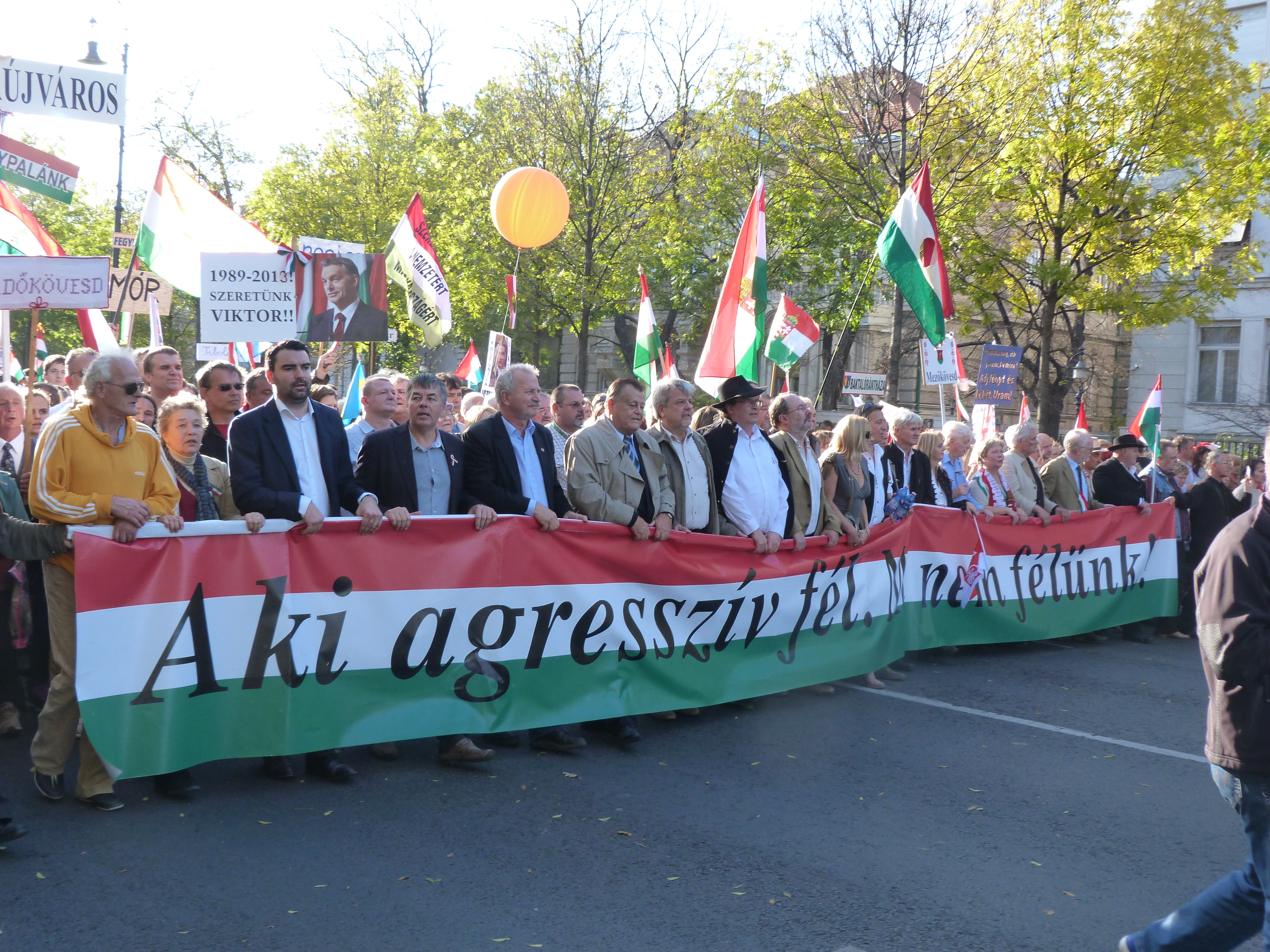
2013 Peace March for Hungary in Budapest

Sometimes the date or location chosen for the demonstration is of historical or cultural significance, such as the anniversary of some event that is relevant to the topic of the demonstration.

Locations are also frequently chosen because of some relevance to the issue at hand. For example, if a demonstration is targeted at issues relating to foreign nation, the demonstration may take place at a location associated with that nation, such as an embassy of the nation in question.

While fixed demonstrations may take place in pedestrian zones, larger marches usually take place on roads. It may happen with or without an official authorization.

== Nonviolence or violence ==
Protest marches and demonstrations are a common nonviolent tactic. They are thus one tactic available to proponents of strategic nonviolence. However, the reasons for avoiding the use of violence may also derive, not from a general doctrine of nonviolence or pacifism, but from considerations relating to the particular situation that is faced, including its legal, cultural and power-political dimensions: this has been the case in many campaigns of civil resistance.

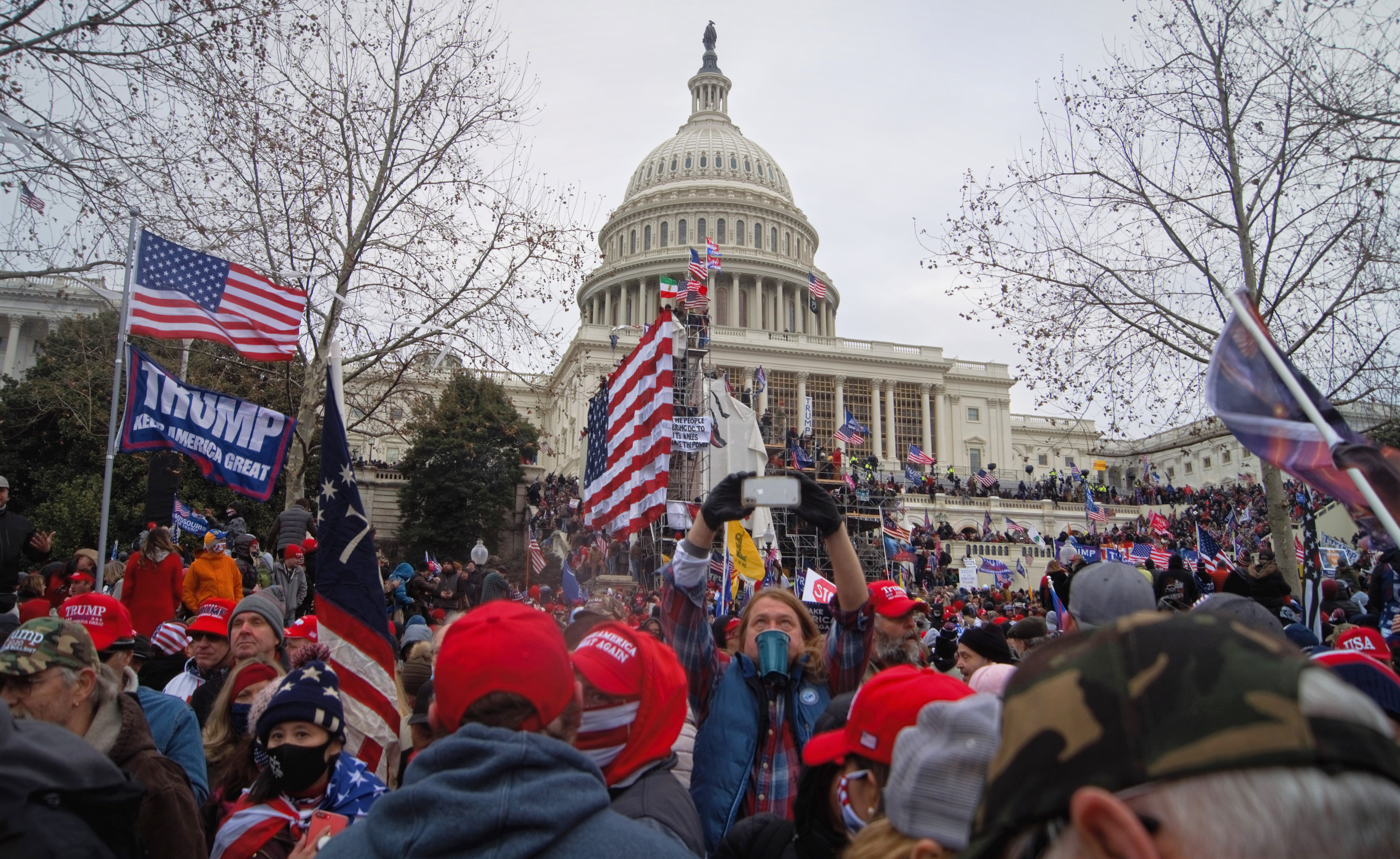
Demonstration turned riot at the US Capitol Building on January 6, 2021.

A common tactic used by nonviolent campaigners is the "dilemma demonstration." Activist trainer Daniel Hunter describes this term as covering "actions that force the target to either let you do what you want, or be shown as unreasonable as they stop you from doing it". A study by Srdja Popovic and Sophia McClennen won the 2020 Brown Democracy Medal for its examination of 44 examples of dilemma demonstrations and the ways in which they were used to achieve goals within civil resistance campaigns.

Some demonstrations and protests can turn, at least partially, into riots or mob violence against objects such as automobiles and businesses, bystanders and the police. Police and military authorities often use non-lethal force or less-lethal weapons, such as tasers, rubber bullets, pepper spray, and tear gas against demonstrators in these situations. Sometimes violent situations are caused by the preemptive or offensive use of these weapons which can provoke, destabilize, or escalate a conflict.

The protests following the murder of George Floyd are well-known examples of political demonstrations addressing racial injustice and police brutality. These demonstrations, which spread across the United States and around the world, brought attention to systemic issues within law enforcement and the broader society. This movement highlighted the importance of political demonstrations in driving social change and influencing public policy, but also showed how protests can turn violent through police intervention.

As a known tool to prevent the infiltration by agents provocateurs, the organizers of large or controversial assemblies may deploy and coordinate demonstration marshals, also called stewards.

== Policing ==
Protest policing or public order policing is part of a state’s response to political dissent and social movements. Police maintenance of public order during protest is an essential component of liberal democracy, with military response to protest being more common under authoritarian regimes.

Australasian, European, and North American democratic states have all experienced increased surveillance of protest movements and more militarized protest policing since 1995 and through the first decades of the 21st century.

Criminalization of dissent is legislation or law enforcement that penalizes political dissent. It may also be accomplished through media that controls public discourse to delegitimize critics of the state. Study of protest criminalization places protest policing in a broader framework of criminology and sociology of law.

== Law by country ==
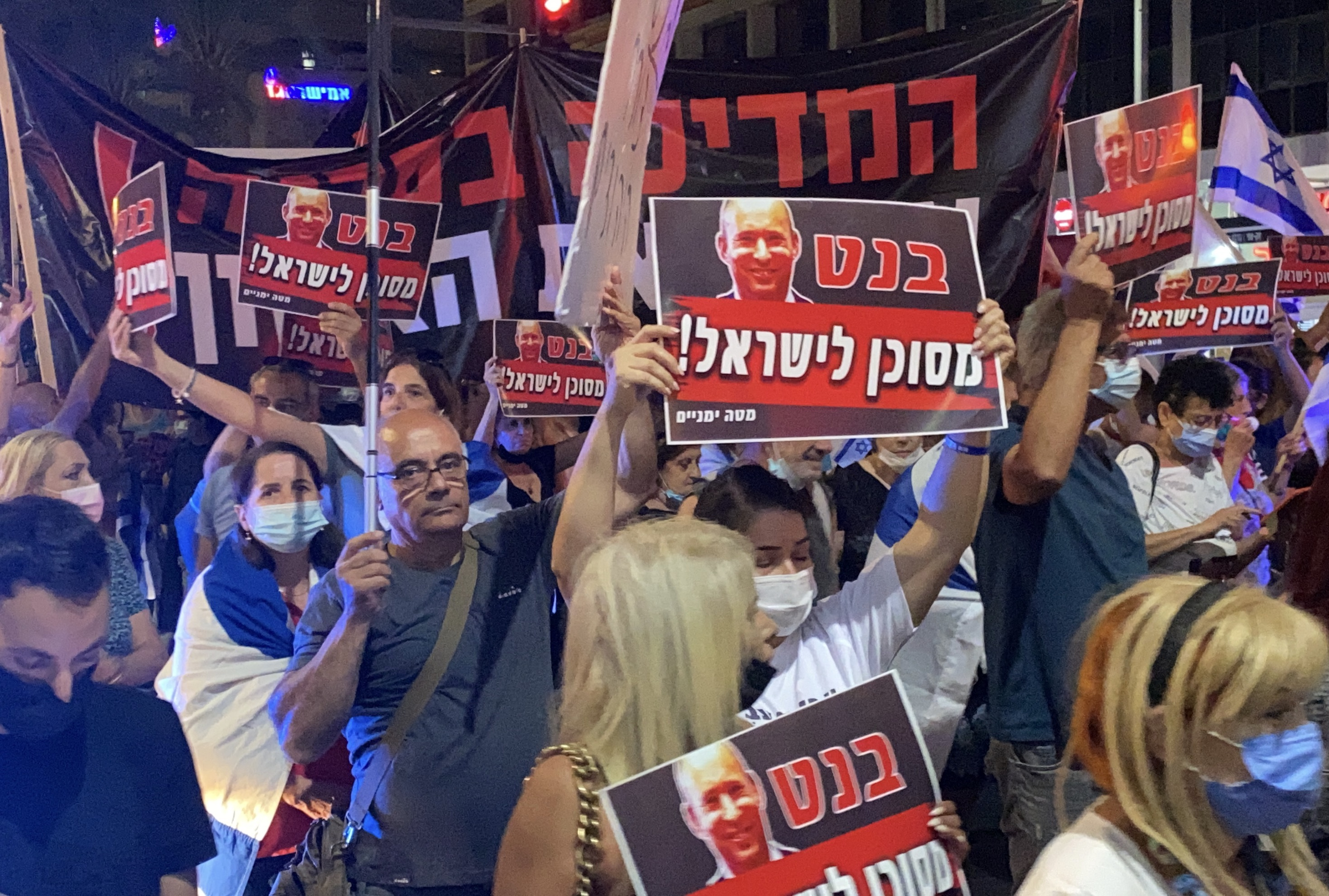
An anti-Naftali Bennett demonstration in Tel Aviv, Israel, on September 23, 2021. One of the signs the demonstrators primarily carried translates in English to "BENNETT DANGEROUS TO ISRAEL!".

=== International ===
The right to demonstrate peacefully is guaranteed by international conventions, in particular by the articles 21 and 22 of the International Covenant on Civil and Political Rights (right of peaceful assembly and right of association). Its implementation is monitored by the United Nations special rapporteur on the right of peaceful assembly and association. In 2019, its report expressed alarm at the restrictions on the freedom of peaceful assembly:

The Special Rapporteur has expressed concern regarding laws adopted in many countries that impose harsh restrictions on assemblies, including provisions relating to blanket bans, geographical restrictions, mandatory notifications and authorizations. [...] The need for prior authorization in order to hold peaceful protests [is] contrary to international law [...].

=== Australia ===
A report released by the Human Rights Law Centre in 2024 states that based on British common law, "Australian courts regard [the right to assembly] as a core part of a democratic system of government." However, there are a number of limitations placed on demonstrations and protest under state, territory and federal legislation, with forty-nine laws introduced regarding them since 2004.

=== Brazil ===
Freedom of assembly in Brazil is granted by art. 5th, item XVI, of the Constitution of Brazil (1988).

=== Germany ===
In Germany, the right to protest is considered a fundamental right in the Grundgesetz. For open-air assemblies, this right may be restricted.

=== Russia ===
Freedom of assembly in the Russian Federation is granted by Art. 31 of the Constitution adopted in 1993:

Citizens of the Russian Federation shall have the right to gather peacefully, without weapons, and to hold meetings, rallies, demonstrations, marches and pickets.

Demonstrations and protests are further regulated by the Federal Law of the Russian Federation No.54-FZ "On Meetings, Rallies, Demonstrations, Marches and Pickets". If the assembly in public is expected to involve more than one participant, its organisers are obliged to notify executive or local self-government authorities of the upcoming event few days in advance in writing. However, legislation does not foresee an authorisation procedure, hence the authorities have no right to prohibit an assembly or change its place unless it threatens the security of participants or is planned to take place near hazardous facilities, important railways, viaducts, pipelines, high voltage electric power lines, prisons, courts, presidential residences or in the border control zone. The right to gather can also be restricted in close proximity of cultural and historical monuments.

=== Singapore ===
Public demonstrations in Singapore are not common, in part because cause-related events require a licence from the authorities. Such laws include the Public Entertainment and Meetings Act and the Public Order Act.

=== United Kingdom ===
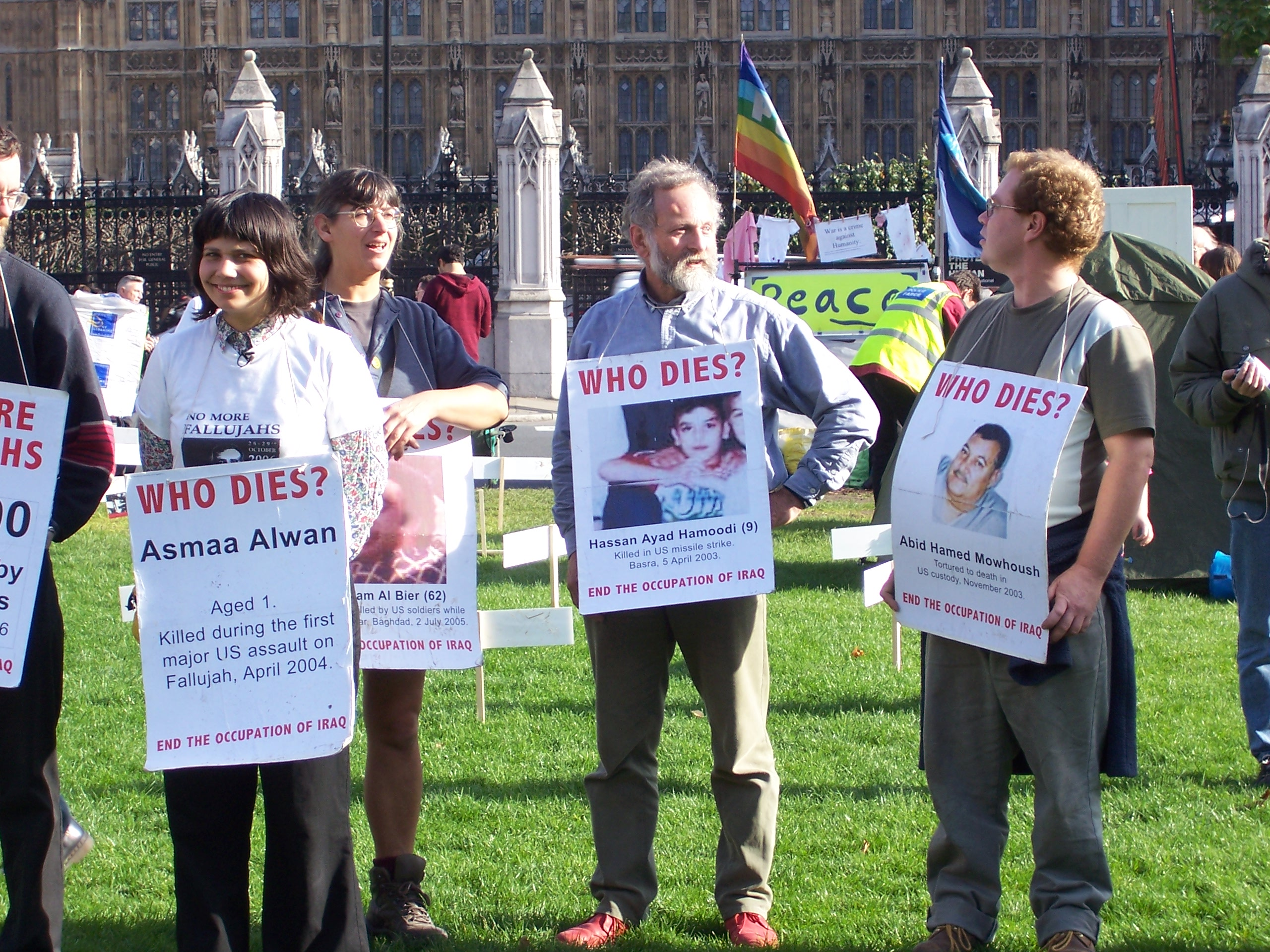
Demonstration in front of the British parliament

Under the Serious Organised Crime and Police Act 2005 and the Terrorism Act 2006, there are areas designated as 'protected sites' where people are not allowed to go. Previously, these were military bases and nuclear power stations, but the law changed in 2007 to include other, generally political areas, such as Downing Street, the Palace of Westminster, and the headquarters of MI5 and MI6. Previously, trespassers to these areas could not be arrested if they had not committed another crime and agreed to be escorted out, but this will change following amendments to the law.

Human rights groups fear the powers could hinder peaceful protest. Nick Clegg, the then Liberal Democrat home affairs spokesman, said: "I am not aware of vast troops of trespassers wanting to invade MI5 or MI6, still less running the gauntlet of security checks in Whitehall and Westminster to make a point. It's a sledgehammer to crack a nut." Liberty, the civil liberties pressure group, said the measure was "excessive".

One of the biggest demonstration in the UK was the people vote march, on 19 October 2019, with around 1 million demonstrators related to the Brexit.

In 2021, the Supreme Court of the United Kingdom ruled that blocking roads can be a lawful way to demonstrate.

=== United States ===
The First Amendment of the United States Constitution specifically allows the freedom of assembly as part of a measure to facilitate the redress of such grievances. "Amendment I: Congress shall make no law ... abridging ... the right of the people peaceably to assemble, and to petition the Government for a redress of grievances."

A growing trend in the United States has been the implementation of "free speech zones", or fenced-in areas which are often far-removed from the event which is being protested; critics of free-speech zones argue that they go against the First Amendment of the United States Constitution by their very nature, and that they lessen the impact the demonstration might otherwise have had. In many areas it is required to get permission from the government to hold a demonstration.

== See also ==
- Civil resistance
- Crowd control
- Fare strike
- International Covenant on Civil and Political Rights
- List of uprisings led by women
- Mass mobilization
- Nonviolent resistance
- Right to protest
- Petition
- List of rallies and protest marches in Washington, D.C.
- List of incidents of civil unrest in the United States
