= List of municipal presidents of Guadalajara =

The following is a list of municipal presidents of the city of Guadalajara, in the Mexican state of Jalisco.

Term	Municipal president	Political party	Note
1542	Miguel de Ibarra		
1542–1912	NA		
1912–1913	Luis González Álvarez		
1915–1916	Wilebaldo F. Romero		
1916–1917	Luis Castellanos y Tapia		
1918	José Rivera Rosas		
1919–1920	Salvador Ulloa		
1920	Manuel Lamadrid		
1920	Rafael Salazar		
1921	Alfredo Romo		
1921	Ignacio Gómez Gallardo		
1922	José L. Suárez		
1922	Luis C. Medina		
1922	José Guadalupe Zuno		
1923	Gustavo R. Cristo		
1923–1924	Narciso Corvera		
1924	Alberto Pérez Rojas		Member of the Delahuertista rebellion
1924–1925	José María Cuéllar		
1926	Ramón Córdova		
1927	Luis R. Castillo		
1928	Juan Manuel Chávez		
1929	Manuel Celis	PNR	
1929–1930	Juan de Dios Robledo	PNR	
1930	José Pascual Alejandre	PNR	
1931	Miguel Colunga	PNR	
1932	Luis F. Ibarra	PNR	
1932	Ramiro Diéguez	PNR	
1933–1934	Eduardo R. González	PNR	
1934	Luis C. Rojas	PNR	
1935	Francisco Romero Gallardo	PNR	
1936	Florencio Topete	PNR	
1936	Juan G. Chávez	PNR	
01/01/1937–31/12/1938	Manuel F. Ochoa	PNR	
01/01/1939–31/12/1940	Luis Álvarez del Castillo	PRM	
01/01/1941–31/12/1942	Salvador González Romo	PRM	
01/01/1943–31/12/1944	Jesús Landeros	PRM	
01/01/1945–31/12/1946	Francisco Arana Hernández	PRM	
01/01/1947–30/09/1948	Heliodoro Hernández Loza	PRI	Last biennium
01/01/1949–31/08/1952	Ángel F. Martínez	PRI	This term was, exceptionally, a four-year one (a quadrennium)
01/09/1952 –31/12/1952	Juan Ignacio Menchaca Manjarrez	PRI	Acting municipal president
01/01/1953–31/12/1955	Jorge Matute Remus	PRI	First triennium
01/01/1956–09/09/1958	Juan Gil Preciado	PRI	
09/09/1958–31/12/1958	José María Ramos	PRI	Acting municipal president
01/01/1959–31/12/1961	Juan Ignacio Menchaca Manjarrez	PRI	
01/01/1962–10/02/1964	Francisco Medina Ascencio	PRI	
11/02/1964-31/12/1964	Dionisio Montelongo Cervantes	PRI	Acting municipal president
01/01/1965–31/12/1967	Eduardo Aviña Bátiz	PRI	
1968–1970	Efraín Urzúa Macías	PRI	
1971–1973	Guillermo Cosío Vidaurri	PRI	
1974–1976	Juan Delgado Navarro	PRI	
1977–1979	Guillermo Reyes Robles	PRI	
1980–1982	Arnulfo Villaseñor Saavedra	PRI	
1982–1985	Guillermo Vallarta Plata	PRI	
1985–1988	Eugenio Ruiz Orozco	PRI	
1988–1992	Gabriel Covarrubias Ibarra	PRI	
1992	Enrique Dau Flores	PRI	
06/05/1992–30/03/1995	Alberto Mora López; President of the City Council	PRI	
31/03/1995–31/12/1997	César L. Coll Carabias	PAN	
01/01/1998–14/02/2000	Francisco Javier Ramírez Acuña	PAN	
15/02/2000–31/12/2000	Héctor Pérez Plazola	PAN	Acting municipal president
01/01/2001–31/12/2003	Fernando Garza Martínez	PAN	This triennium was the last one that had the figure of municipal vice president: Carlos Urrea García Rulfo
01/01/2004-–05/12/2005	Emilio González Márquez	PAN	
06/12/2005–31/12/2006	Ernesto Alfredo Espinosa Guarro	PAN	Acting municipal president
01/01/2007– 30/09/2009	Alfonso Petersen	PAN	
01/10/2009–31/12/2009	Juan Pablo de la Torre Salcedo	PAN	Acting municipal president
01/10/2009–11/01/2012	Aristóteles Sandoval	PRI	
12/01/2012–30/09/2012	Francisco Ayón López	PRI	Acting municipal president
01/10/2012–30/09/2015	Ramiro Hernández García	PRI	
01/10/2015–17/12/2017	Enrique Alfaro Ramírez	MC	
17/12/2017–30/09/2018	Enrique Ibarra Pedroza	MC	Acting municipal president
01/10/2018–28/02/2021	Ismael del Toro Castro	MC	
01/03/2021–10/04/2021	Bárbara Lizette Trigueros Becerra	MC	Acting municipal president
10/04/2021–30/09/2021	Eduardo Fabián Martínez Lomelí	MC	Acting municipal president
01/10/2021–26/10/2023	Pablo Lemus Navarro	MC	Applied for a leave to run for the governorship of Jalisco
27/10/2023–30/09/2024	Juan Francisco Ramírez Salcido	MC	Acting municipal president
01/10/2024–	Verónica Delgadillo García	MC	

== See also ==
- Timeline of Guadalajara
