= 2006 Jalisco state election =

Local election in Mexico

A local election was held in the Mexican state of Jalisco on Sunday, July 2, 2006. Voters went to the polls to elect, on the local level:

- A new Governor of Jalisco to serve for a six-year term. Emilio González Márquez (PAN) won.
- 125 municipal presidents (mayors) to serve for a three-year term.
- 40 local deputies (20 by the first-past-the-post system and 20 by proportional representation) to serve for a three-year term in the Congress of Jalisco.

== Gubernatorial Election ==
Eight political parties participated in the 2006 Jalisco state election; two of them (the PRD and the PT) joined forces.

Party/Alliance	Candidate	Votes	Percent
National Action Party	Emilio González Márquez	1,296,745	45.19
Institutional Revolutionary Party	Arturo Zamora Jiménez	1,187,822	41.40
Party of the Democratic Revolution, Labor Party	Enrique Ibarra Pedroza	224,590	7.83
New Alliance Party	Fernando Espinoza de los Monteros	48,355	1.69
Social Democratic Alternative Party	Oliva Ornelas Torres	36,266	1.26
Convergence	Antonio Jaime Reynoso	17,829	0.62
Ecologist Green Party of Mexico	Adalberto Velasco Antillón	0	0.00
Write-in		3,501	0.12
None		54,214	1.89
Total		2,869,322	100.00

Source: Instituto Electoral del Estado de Jalisco

== See also ==
- 2006 Mexican elections
