= EU-Latin America summit of 2004 protest activity =

Series of public protests

The 2004 EU-Latin America summit protest activity, also known as the Guadalajara Riots, were a series of public protests in Guadalajara's city centre that involved Mexican and foreign activists just a short distance from the meeting of the 58 leaders which included a group of representants of developing states led by India, South Africa and Brazil during the Third Summit of Heads of State and Governments from Latin America, the Caribbean and the European Union on 28 May 2004. Around 20 people were injured and more than 90 arrested. The reaction of the state police and other officials has been target of criticism from human rights associations such as Human Rights Watch.

== See also ==
- Anti-globalisation
- List of demonstrations against corporate globalisation
