= Aristóteles Sandoval =

Mexican politician and lawyer (1974–2020)

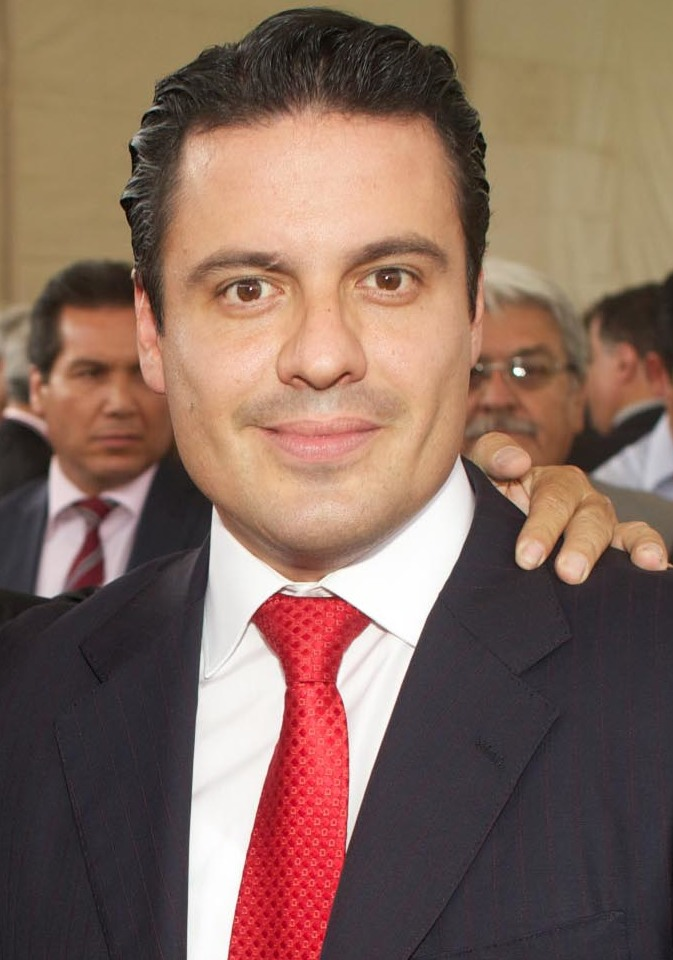

Governor of Jalisco
- In office 1 March 2012 – 5 December 2018
- Preceded by: Emilio González Márquez
- Succeeded by: Enrique Alfaro Ramírez

Municipal president of Guadalajara
- In office 1 January 2010 – 11 January 2012
- Preceded by: Juan Pablo de la Torre Salcedo
- Succeeded by: Francisco Ayón López

Personal details
- Born: Jorge Aristóteles Sandoval Díaz; 22 January 1974 Guadalajara, Jalisco
- Died: 18 December 2020 (aged 46) Puerto Vallarta, Mexico
- Cause of death: Assassination
- Party: Institutional Revolutionary Party
- Spouse: Lorena Arriaga

Jorge Aristóteles Sandoval Díaz (22 January 1974 – 18 December 2020) was a Mexican politician belonging to the Institutional Revolutionary Party (PRI). He served as Governor of Jalisco from 2013 to 2018.

On 18 December 2020 he was assassinated in Puerto Vallarta, Jalisco.

== Education and personal life ==
Aristóteles Sandoval was the son of Leonel Sandoval and Sagrario Díaz. His father was a magistrate for the Supreme Court of Justice of the State of Jalisco.

He completed his bachelor's degree at the University of Guadalajara. He also has a degree in law from the University of Guadalajara and a master's degree in politics and public development from the Western Institute of Technology and Higher Education.

He was the head of the University of Guadalajara student organization, the Federation of University Students (FEU) and directed the PRI youth organization, the Revolutionary Youth Front (FJR) of Guadalajara.

== Political activity ==
Between 2001 and 2003, he was an alderman for the City of Guadalajara and a member of the Councillor Commissions of Justice (as president), Sports and Youth Care (president), Finance and Budget, and Urban Development. As an alderman, he proposed the creation of the Municipal Institute of Youth Care.

In 2003, he was elected as a state delegate for District XI of Guadalajara, presiding over the Commission of Finance and Budget for the LVII Congress of Jalisco. He held this position until 2006. After that, he was the PRI's 2006 mayoral precandidate for Guadalajara, but declined in favor of Leobardo Alcalá Padilla.

=== Municipal President of Guadalajara ===
In the 2009 Jalisco state elections, he won the municipal presidency of Guadalajara for the term lasting from 2010 to 2012. He competed against Jorge Salinas Osornio of the National Action Party (PAN). The city was governed by the PRI for three consecutive terms. At age 35, he became the youngest municipal president to have governed the city of Guadalajara.

=== Governor of Jalisco ===
==== Gubernatorial election ====
On 11 January 2012, Aristóteles Sandoval requested to leave the municipal presidency in order to register himself as a gubernatorial candidate for the state of Jalisco. He ran on behalf of a coalition formed by the PRI and the Mexican Green Party, called Compromiso por Jalisco. The city council appointed Jesús Ayón López as interim municipal president in his place. In this way, he competed in the 2012 Jalisco state elections against candidates Enrique Alfaro Ramírez of the Partido Movimiento Ciudadano, Fernando Garza Martínez of the Party of the Democratic Revolution, Fernando Guzmán Pérez Peláez of the National Action Party and María de los Ángeles Martínez Valdivia of the New Alliance Party. The campaign began on 30 March 2012.

The election was conducted on 1 July 2012. The results provided by the Programa de Resultados Preliminares (PREP) declared Sandoval the winner with 98% of the votes counted and a margin of 4 percentage points over the closest contender, Enrique Alfaro Ramírez. Regardless, the election results were challenged by the Movimiento Ciudadano party, but the challenge was dismissed by the Jalisco Electoral Tribunal, ratifying the election of Sandoval as governor. As a consequence, on 8 July 2012, Sandoval received certification on behalf of the Instituto Electoral and from Participación Ciudadana, declaring him as governor elect.

==== Gubernatorial term ====
On 1 March 2013, Sandoval was sworn into office, officially assuming the governorship of Jalisco.

== Assassination ==
On 18 December 2020, Sandoval had dinner at the Distrito 5 restaurant in the centre of Puerto Vallarta with three other people. During that time, Sandoval was shot and critically injured from behind in the restaurant bathroom. After the shooting, his two bodyguards tried to take him to the hospital. Other gunmen appeared and opened fire, killing Sandoval and wounding one of the bodyguards.

A march demanding the release of two restaurant employees who had been arrested on 30 December 2020 for altering the crime scene was organized on social media in Jalisco.

=== Killing of suspect ===
On 22 April 2022, the Mexican Army gunned down and killed the alleged mastermind of Sandoval's assassination, Saúl Alejandro Rincón Godoy, a.k.a. "El Chopa" or "Señor de Vallarta", in the streets of the Marina Vallarta District, in Puerto Vallarta, State of Jalisco. Wounded, "El Chopa" was taken to a clinic of the Mexican Social Security Institute (IMSS), where he died hours later.

== See also ==
- List of municipal presidents of Guadalajara
- Governor of Jalisco
- Cabinet of Aristóteles Sandoval

Political offices
Preceded by Juan Pablo de la Torre Salcedo	Municipal president of Guadalajara; 2009–2012	Succeeded by Francisco Ayón López
Preceded by Emilio González Márquez	Governor of Jalisco; 2012–2018	Succeeded by Enrique Alfaro Ramírez
