= Emilio González Márquez =

Mexican politician

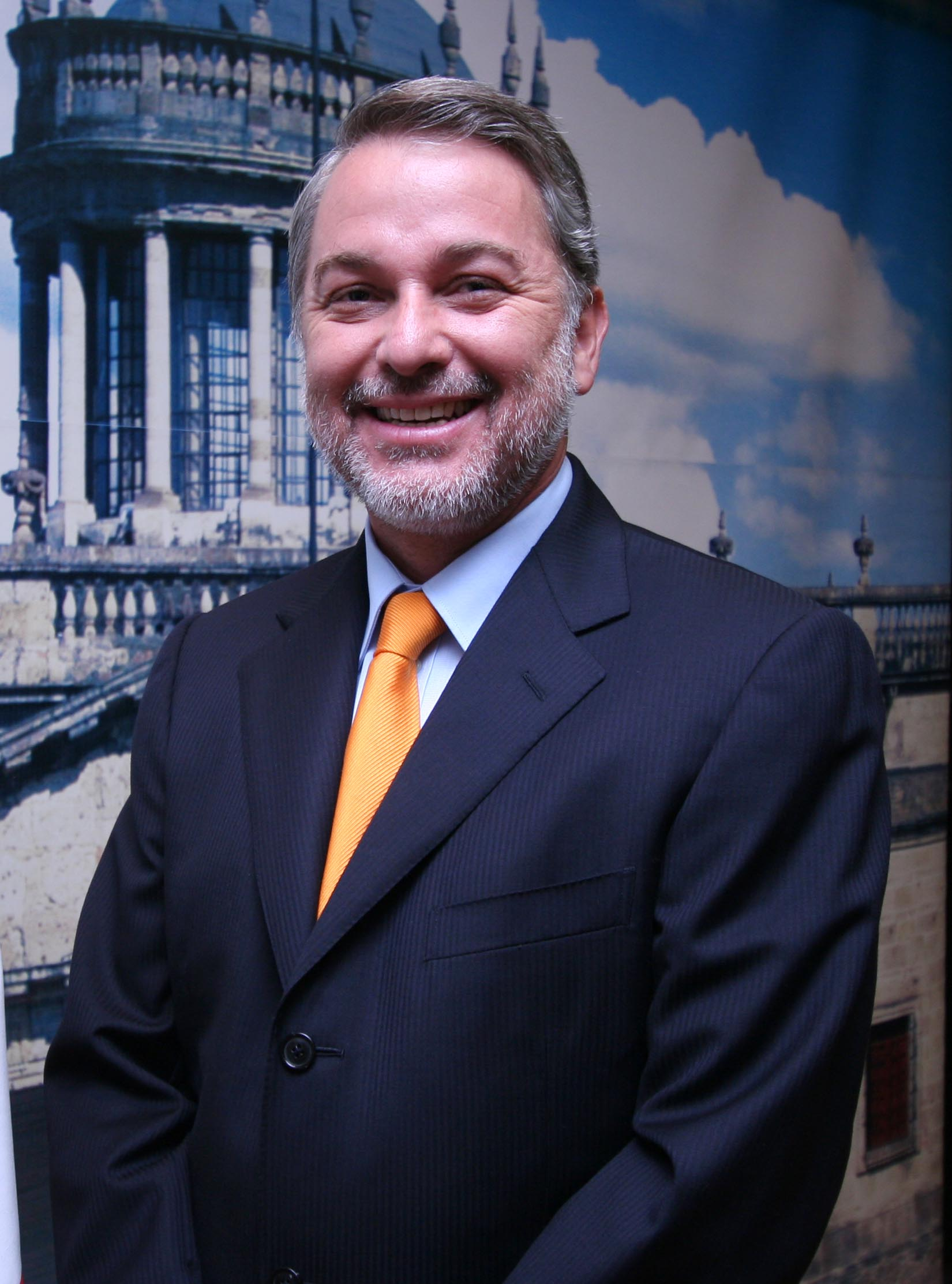

Governor of Jalisco
- In office 1 March 2007 – 28 February 2013
- Preceded by: Gerardo Octavio Solís Gómez
- Succeeded by: Jorge Aristóteles Sandoval Díaz

Municipal president of Guadalajara
- In office 1 January 2004 – 5 December 2005
- Preceded by: Fernando Garza Martínez
- Succeeded by: Ernesto Alfredo Espinosa Guarro

Personal details
- Born: November 12, 1960 (age 64); Lagos de Moreno, Jalisco
- Political party: National Action Party
- Spouse: Imelda Guzmán
- Profession: Public Accountant

Emilio González Márquez (born 12 November 1960 in Lagos de Moreno, Jalisco) is a Mexican politician affiliated with the National Action Party (PAN). He served as Governor of Jalisco. from 2007 to 2013

== Political career ==
González was an active member of the Mexican Democratic Party (PDM); he served as municipal president (mayor) of Lagos de Moreno representing the PDM (1980–1982). He resigned from the PDM in 1988.

In 1992 González joined the National Action Party (PAN) and secured a seat in the Chamber of Deputies via proportional representation. From 1995 to 1997 he served as Regidor of the municipality of Guadalajara. In 1997 he was elected to serve in the LVII Legislature of the Mexican Congress. González presided over the PAN in the State of Jalisco from 1999 to 2002. In 2003 he was elected municipal president of Guadalajara; he assumed office on 1 January 2004, and left the position on 6 December 2005 seeking his party nomination for the governorship of Jalisco; he won his party's internal bid with 55.17% of the votes.

== See also ==
- List of municipal presidents of Guadalajara
- 2006 Jalisco state election
- Governor of Jalisco
- Cabinet of Emilio González Márquez

Preceded by Gerardo Octavio Solís Gómez	Governor of Jalisco; 2007 - 2013	Succeeded by Jorge Aristóteles Sandoval Díaz
Preceded by Fernando Garza Martínez	Municipal President of Guadalajara, Jalisco; 2003 - 2005	Succeeded by Ernesto Espinosa Guarro
