= Alfonso Petersen =

Mexican physician and politician

Alfonso Petersen Farah (born 2 February 1961) is a Mexican physician and politician who served as municipal president of Guadalajara, Jalisco, from 2007 to 2009.

Petersen studied medicine at the LaSalle University and the National Autonomous University of Mexico (UNAM). He also served as Jalisco's state health secretary. In July 2006, he was elected municipal president of Guadalajara, representing the National Action Party (PAN), and assumed office on 31 December 2006.

In October 2009, during the 2009 flu pandemic, Petersen resigned his position and was succeeded by Alfonso Gutiérrez Carranza as Jalisco's secretary of public health.

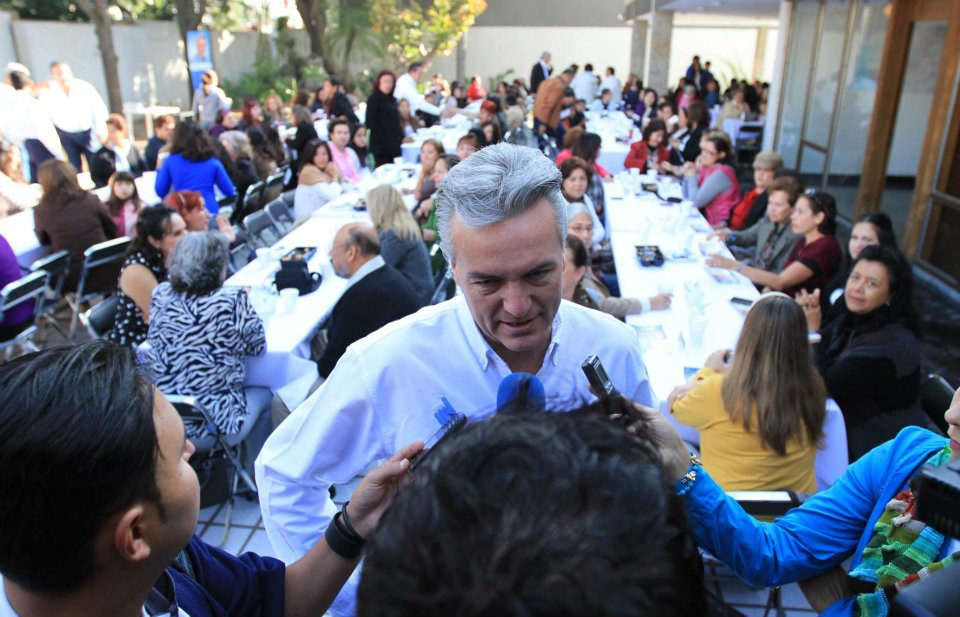
Alfonso Petersen, Meeting Women in Guadalajara.

== See also ==
- 2006, Jalisco state election

Preceded by Ernesto Espinosa Guarro	Municipal President of Guadalajara, Jalisco; 2006–2009	Succeeded by Jorge Aristóteles Sandoval Díaz
