= Arturo Zamora Jiménez =

Mexican lawyer and politician

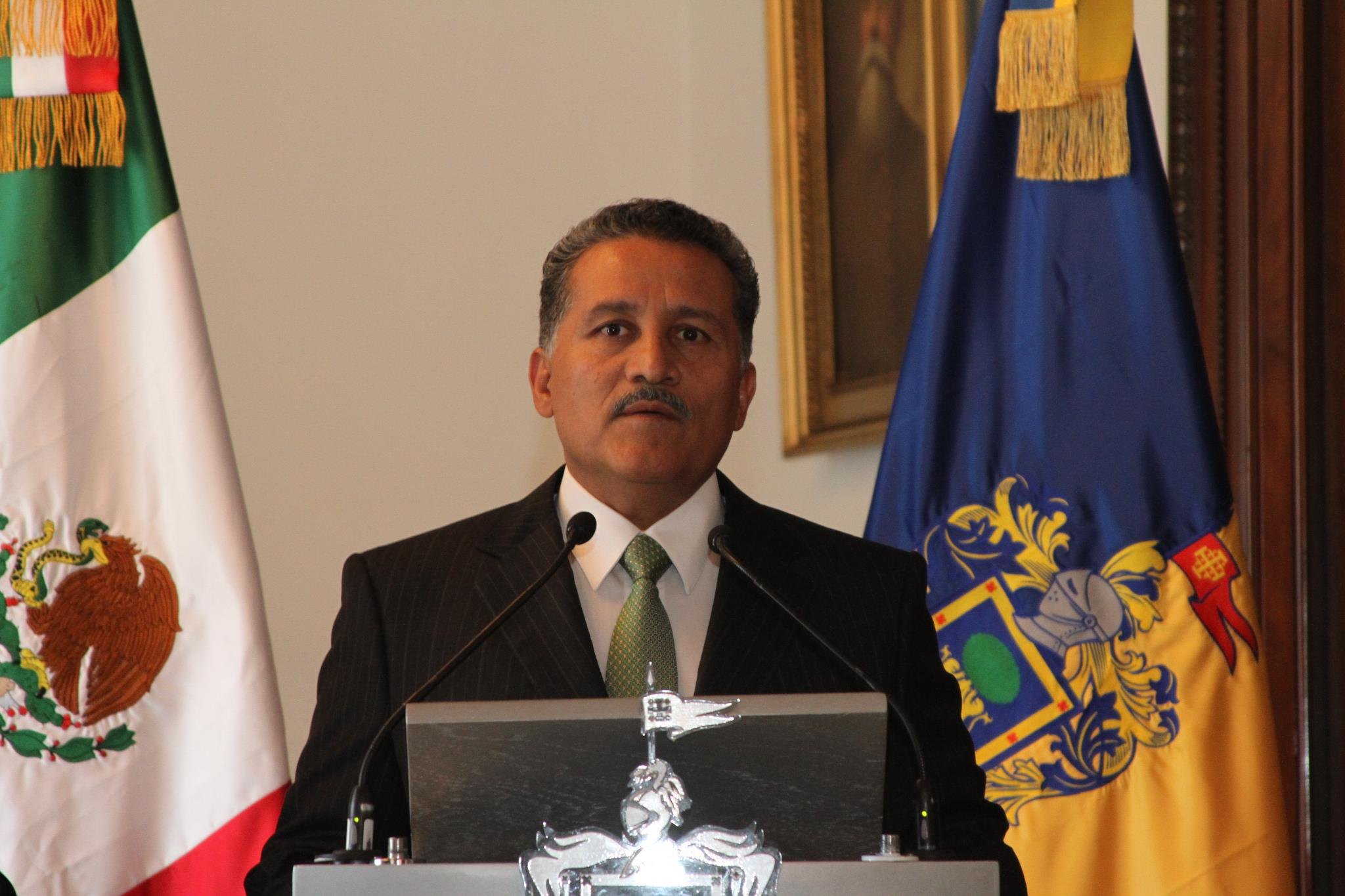
Arturo Zamora Jiménez

Arturo Zamora Jiménez (born March 30, 1956, in Guadalajara, Jalisco) is a Mexican lawyer and politician affiliated with the Institutional Revolutionary Party (PRI). He has served as a Senator and Deputy in the Mexican Congress and ran unsuccessfully as the PRI candidate for the governorship of Jalisco in the 2006 state election.

Zamora studied law at the Universidad de Guadalajara (UdeG). He has worked as a lawyer and notary public in his native Jalisco. He is a divorced father of three.

== Political career ==
In 1982, Zamora joined the PRI and has remained an active member since. In 2003, he was elected municipal president of Zapopan. In the 2009 mid-terms, he was elected to the Chamber of Deputies to represent Jalisco's 4th district during the 61st session of Congress.

== See also ==
- 2006 Jalisco state election
