= César Coll Carabias =

Mexican politician (born 1947)

César Luis Coll Carabias (Note: In this Spanish name, the first or paternal surname is Coll and the second or maternal family name is Carabias.) (born 11 April 1947) is a Mexican politician affiliated with the National Action Party (PAN). He has served in Congress and as municipal president of Guadalajara, Jalisco.

== Career ==
César Coll Carabias was born on 11 April 1947 in Mexico City to a Spanish Republican exile who arrived in Mexico in 1940 in the aftermath of the Civil War.

In the 1988 general election, he was elected to the Chamber of Deputies to represent Jalisco's 13th district during the 54th session of Congress. He was later municipal president of Guadalajara from 1995 to 1997, the first to be elected from the ranks of the PAN.

He was arrested for embezzlement on 23 October 2015.
