= Congress of Jalisco =

Legislature of Jalisco, Mexico

Congress of the State of Jalisco Congreso del Estado de Jalisco
- LXII Legislature

Type
- Type: Unicameral

History
- Founded: September 8, 1823

Leadership
- President: Julio Cesar Hurtado Luna, PAN since November 11, 2025
- Vice President: Claudia Murguía Torres, PAN since November 11, 2025
- Vice President: Alondra Getsemany Fausto de Leon, PRI since November 11, 2025

Structure
- Seats: 38
- Political groups: MC (11) Morena (8) PAN (5) Hagamos (3) PRI (3) PVEM (3) Futuro (2) PT (2) Independent (1)
- Authority: Title IV, Chapter I of the Political Constitution of the State of Jalisco

Elections
- Voting system: First-past-the-post for 20 electoral district seats and Mixed-member proportional representation for 18 proportional representation seats
- Last election: June 2, 2024
- Next election: 2027

Meeting place
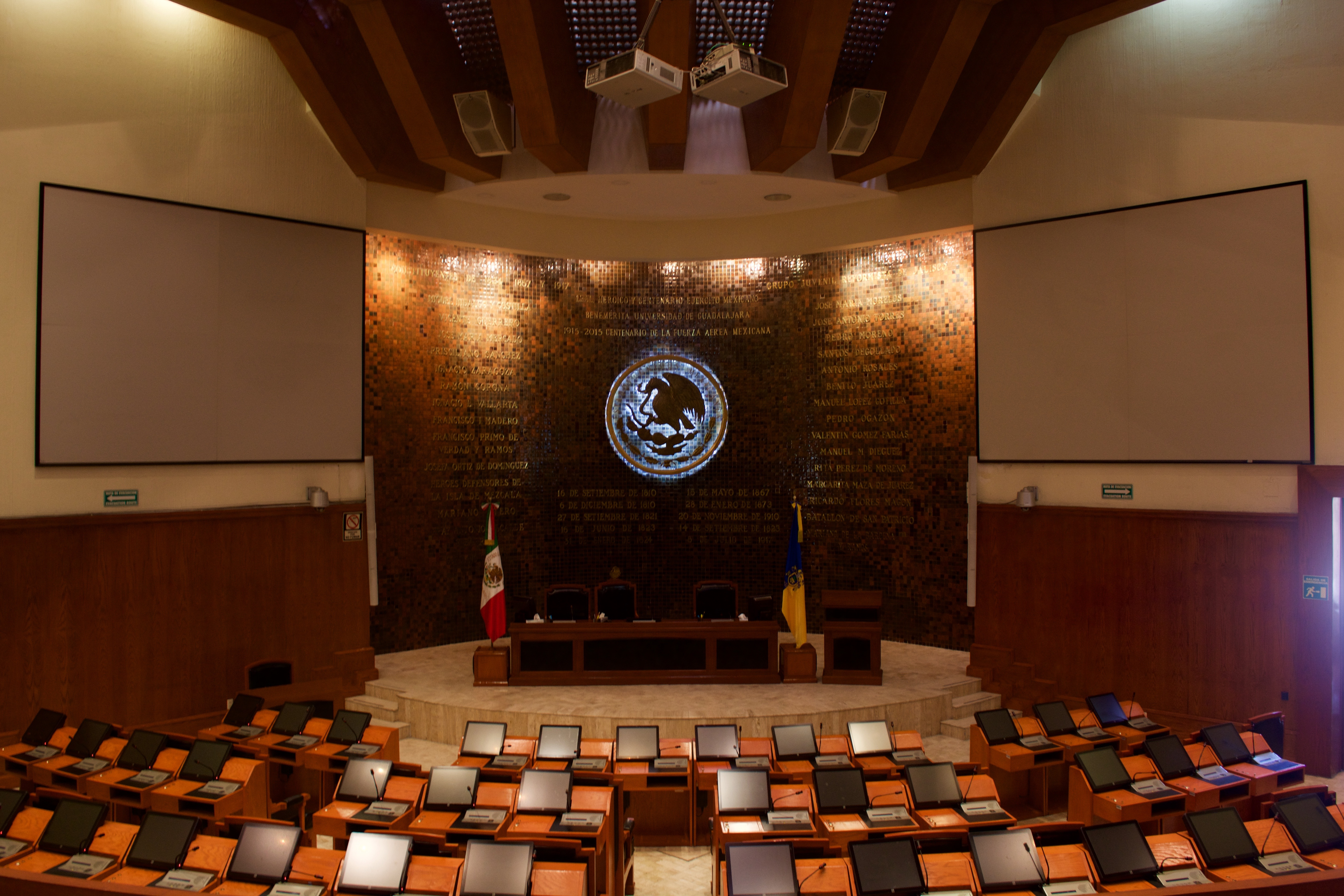
- Palace of the Legislative Power of Jalisco, Guadalajara, Jalisco, Mexico

Website
- www.congresojal.gob.mx

The Congress of the State of Jalisco (Spanish: Congreso del Estado de Jalisco) is the legislative branch of the government of the State of Jalisco. It was constituted for the first time after the independence of Mexico on September 8, 1823. Having its first session on September 14 of the same year. The Congress is the governmental deliberative body of Jalisco, which is equal to, and independent of, the executive.

At present it is composed of an assembly of 38 deputies, 20 of whom are elected on a first-past-the-post basis, one for each district in which the entity is divided. The rest is elected through a system of proportional representation. Deputies are elected to serve for a three-year term. Its headquarters is the Palace of the Legislative Power of Jalisco, in the Historic Center of Guadalajara. Since its formation, the congress has been renewed 61 times.

In the Congress there are 21 Legislative Commissions in charge of analyzing and commenting on the bills and initiatives that are presented to the vote of the whole chamber. These bodies are made up of deputies. It also has a board of directors that is responsible for the legal representation of the Congress and coordinating the work of the committees.

== Organization ==
The State Congress works as an assembly and it is assisted in the fulfillment of its duties by:

1. Board of Directors
2. Legislative Commissions
3. Committees
4. Administrative and technical bodies

== See also ==
- List of Mexican state congresses
