= Antimonumento 5J =

Anti-monument in Guadalajara, Mexico

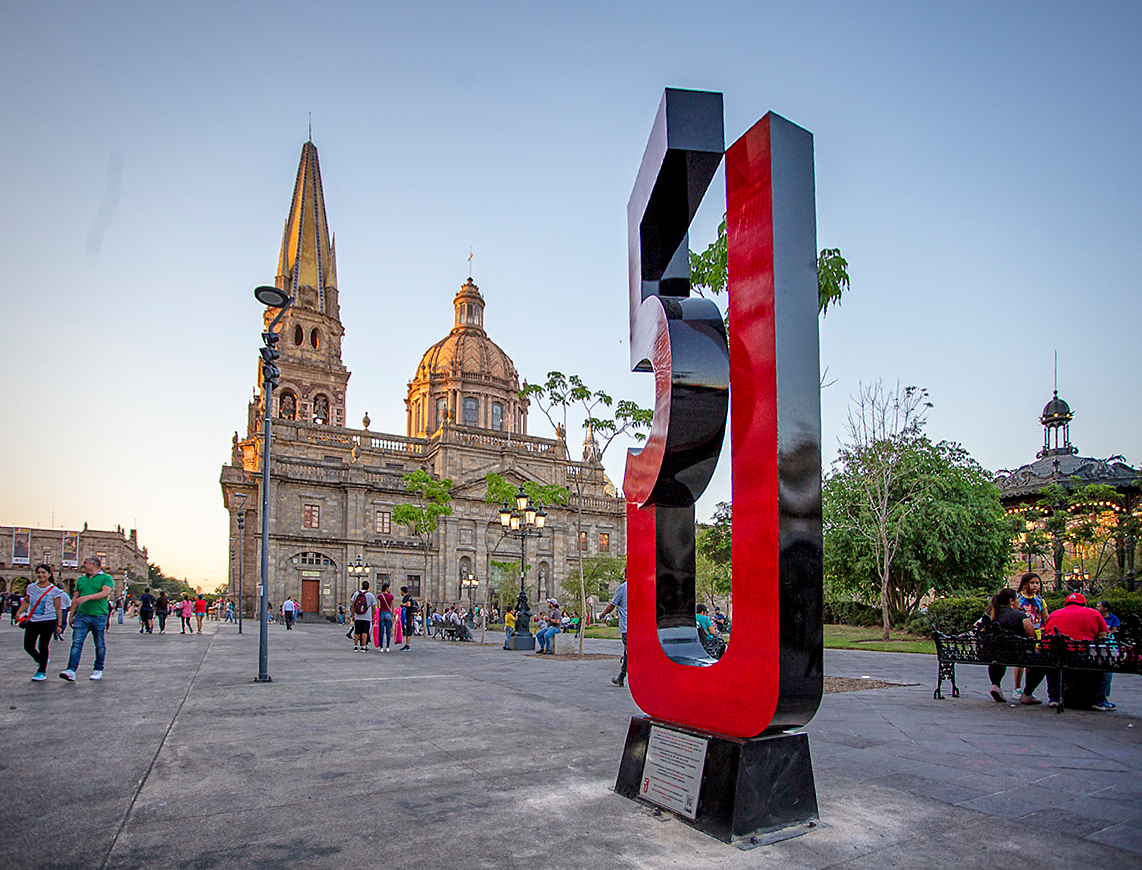
- The original anti-monument
- Location
- Location: Guadalajara, Jalisco, Mexico
- Coordinates: 20°40′34″N 103°20′50″W
- Designer: Anonymous demonstrators
- Type: Antimonumento
- Material: Steel (original); Rod and LED lights (replica)
- Height: 3.4 m (11 ft) (original); Around 2 m (6 ft 7 in) (replica)
- Weight: Over 300 kg (660 lb) (original)
- Opening date: 5 June 2023 (original); 5 July 2023 (replica)
- Dedicated to: Giovanni López and those repressed during the protests related to his death
- Dismantled date: 5 June 2023 (original)

The Antimonumento 5J is an antimonumento (anti-monument) installed in the Plaza de Armas of Guadalajara, Jalisco, Mexico. Human rights groups erected the sculpture in front of the State Government Palace to commemorate the protests of 4, 5, and 6 June 2020, during which state police violently repressed demonstrators protesting the death of Giovanni López, who had died in police custody the previous month.

Human rights groups placed the artwork adjacent to Antimonumenta on 5 June 2023. It was never given an official name; it is known as Antimonumento 5J, Antimonumento 5 de Junio, or simply 5J. It features a red-painted number five placed above a letter "J". Hours later, at night, authorities removed the sculpture, citing that its placement was unauthorized. Although judges later ordered its reinstatement, the state government declined to comply, arguing that it posed public safety concerns. In response, human rights groups installed a smaller, removable replica the following month, composed of LED lights and rods.

== Background ==
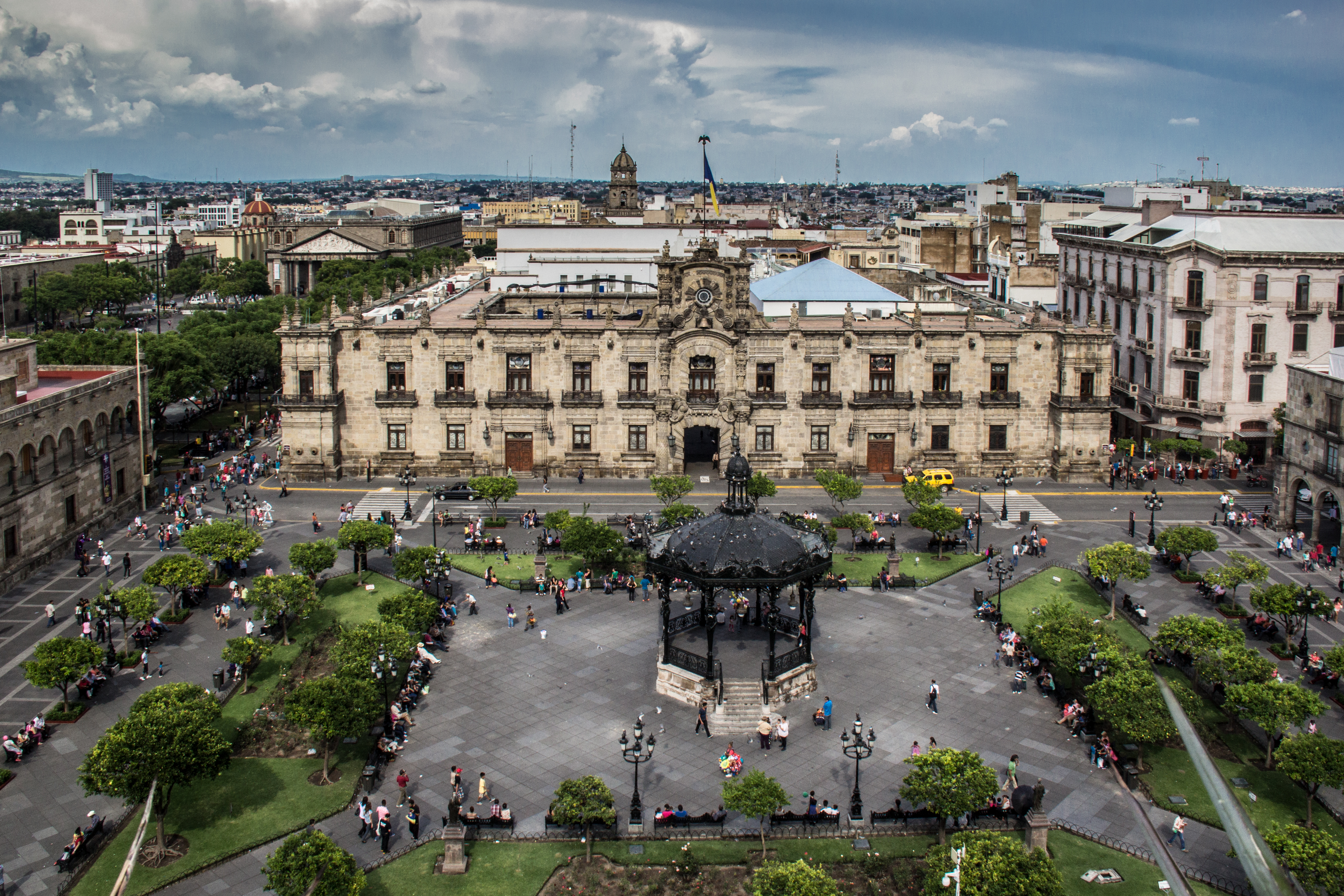
The State Government Palace in 2014. The demonstrations occurred in the area.

During the night of 4 May 2020, Giovanni López (c. 1990 – 4 or 5 May 2020), a bricklayer, was arrested outside his family's house in the municipality of Ixtlahuacán de los Membrillos, Jalisco. According to reports, police detained him for allegedly not wearing a face mask during the COVID-19 pandemic in Mexico and for assaulting officers while resisting arrest. Giovanni's brother, Christian, recorded the arrest, capturing footage of officers verbally insulting his family as they placed Giovanni into a police van. Enrique Alfaro Ramírez, the state governor, had made the use of face masks mandatory.

The following day, Christian contacted the municipal president, Eduardo Cervantes, who instructed them to pick Giovanni up at the local police station. There, officials informed Christian that Giovanni had been transferred to the Guadalajara Civil Hospital; upon arrival, he was informed that Giovanni had died. An autopsy later determined that he had died from blunt force trauma to the head and also had a gunshot wound in one of his legs. According to the family, Cervantes offered them 200,000 Mexican pesos (US$9,136) in exchange for not releasing the video of the arrest. They stated they refused the offer and were subsequently threatened with death if the footage was made public.

On 25 May 2020, George Floyd was murdered by a police officer in Minneapolis, United States. His death sparked widespread protests across the U.S. and internationally, including in Mexico, where concerns over police brutality were also longstanding. Inspired by the similarities between Floyd's case and that of his brother, Christian sent his video to the media on 1 June. The footage went viral and triggered protests on 4 June in Guadalajara, the capital city of Jalisco. Demonstrators gathered in the city's historic center, where they clashed with police and vandalized the State Government Palace. Police responded with tear gas and arrested 26 people.

Alfaro, member of the Citizens' Movement party, blamed the unrest on political adversaries in the Federal Government and Mexico City Government, both led by the ruling National Regeneration Movement party) claiming they sought to destabilize his administration. Alfaro also denied that Giovanni had been arrested for not wearing a face mask. According to the official police report, the arrest was due to an "administrative offense" because he had allegedly acted aggressively toward officers while under the influence.

The next day, demonstrators gathered to demand the release of individuals detained during the previous day's protest. During the mobilization, groups of plainclothes riot officers conducted arbitrary arrests. Witnesses reported that the officers used electric shocks and threatened to hand detainees over to cartels. While official sources reported 16 arrests, eyewitnesses estimated that at least 80 people were detained. Alfaro claimed that some agents of the Jalisco State Prosecutor's Office had acted in collusion with organized crime and had disobeyed official orders. Authorities later announced that 11 agents had been arrested in connection with the abuses committed during the protest.

On 6 June 2020, demonstrations continued in Guadalajara, with protesters demanding the release of those detained and clarification regarding the whereabouts of up to 38 individuals reported as forcibly disappeared. In response, Governor Alfaro issued a public apology and ordered the release of all detainees. However, reports emerged that some detainees had been abandoned on the outskirts of the city the previous night. The event was later dubbed the "Halconazo tapatío", referencing the 1971 massacre known as "El Halconazo", in which paramilitary groups without their uniforms arbitrarily assassinated protesters in Mexico City, combined with the regional term for "from Jalisco".

== History and installation ==
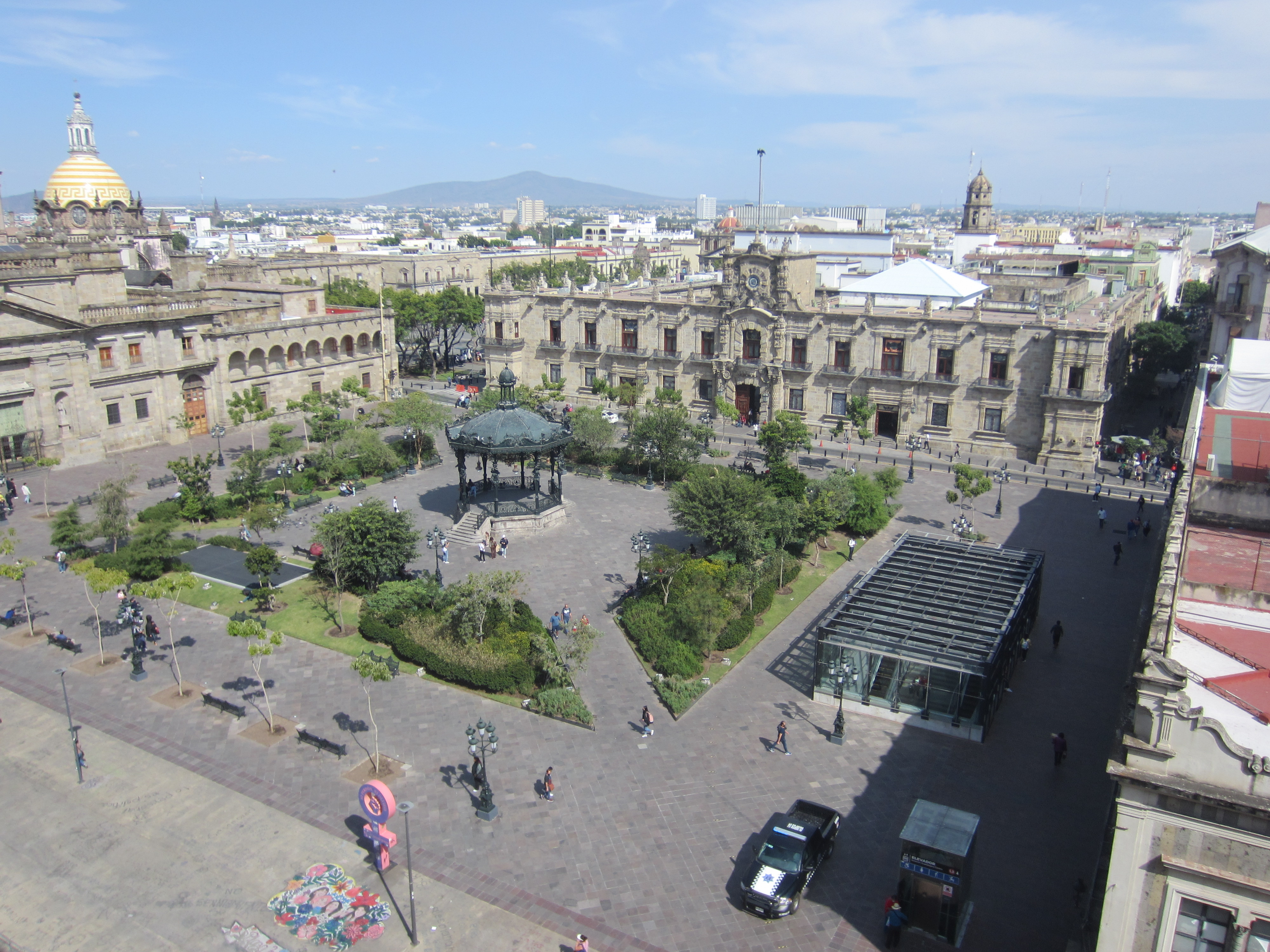
Plaza de Armas in 2021 (left). The Antimonumento 5J (not pictured) was installed adjacent to the Antimonumenta (lower left corner) opposite the State Government Palace.

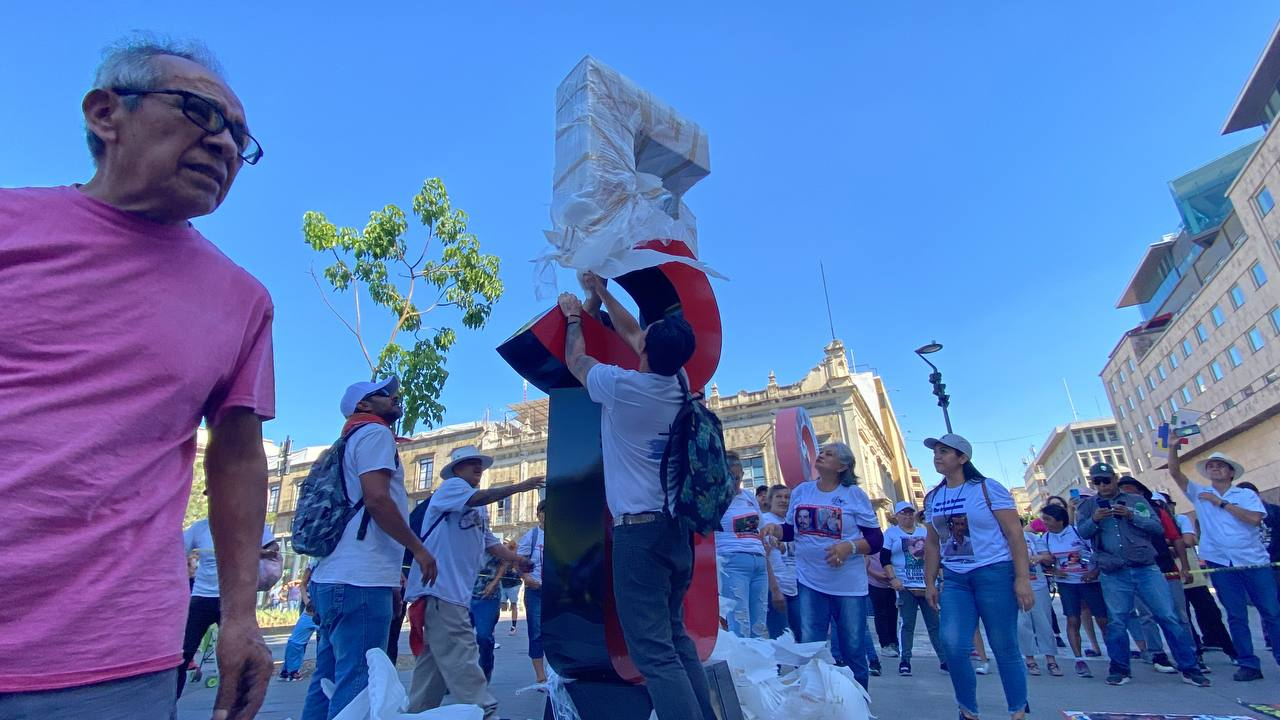
The anti-monument during its installation in 2023

During a demonstration commemorating the "Halconazo tapatío" on 5 June 2023, various collectives placed an anti-monument in Plaza de Armas, opposite the State Government Palace, and next to the Antimonumenta, a—another anti-monument that symbolizes the demand for justice for women who suffer from violence in Mexico.

The sculpture is a red metal structure that stands 3.4 m (11 ft) tall and weighs over 300 kg (660 lb). It alludes to the 5 June protest through the inclusion of a number five above the letter "J", and it honors Giovanni and those who were repressed during the protests related to his death. At the base of the sculpture is an aluminum plaque with the following text (translated from Spanish):

Although the CNDH [National Human Rights Commission] and the FGR [Attorney General of Mexico] took over the case, the serious human rights violations have not been properly investigated, nor has the damage been repaired. We hold the government of Jalisco responsible for these events, pointing out that disappearances and state impunity persist[.] (Note: Original text in Spanish: "A pesar que la CNDH y la FGR atrajeron el caso, las graves violaciones a los derechos humanos no han sido debidamente investigadas, tampoco se ha reparado el daño. Responsabilizamos al gobierno de Jalisco por los hechos, apuntando que las desapariciones y la impunidad en el estado continúan".)

The collectives criticized both the FGR for declaring the events outside its jurisdiction and the CNDH for concluding that there were no cases of forced disappearance or torture. The collective #5deJunioMemoria said that Giovanni's case was not an isolated incident, but rather an example of systemic and widespread police brutality in Mexico. They also reported that since the event, authorities had taken no action in response to Alfaro's claim that organized crime had infiltrated the prosecutor's office.

At 11:40 p.m. that same day, the plaza's lights were turned off, and a group of men arrived in a pickup truck. Using sledgehammers, they dismantled and removed the sculpture. The following morning, Alfaro confirmed that he and Guadalajara's municipal president, Pablo Lemus Navarro, had ordered its removal, citing the lack of official authorization for its installation. Lemus stated that the government would return the sculpture if its owners formally requested it. The collectives behind the installation condemned the removal and described it as an unprecedented act of repression. The sculpture was initially stored in a warehouse in Guadalajara and before being transferred to the Poncitlán Regional Civil Protection and Fire Department because of its dimensions.

=== Replica and ordered reinstallation ===
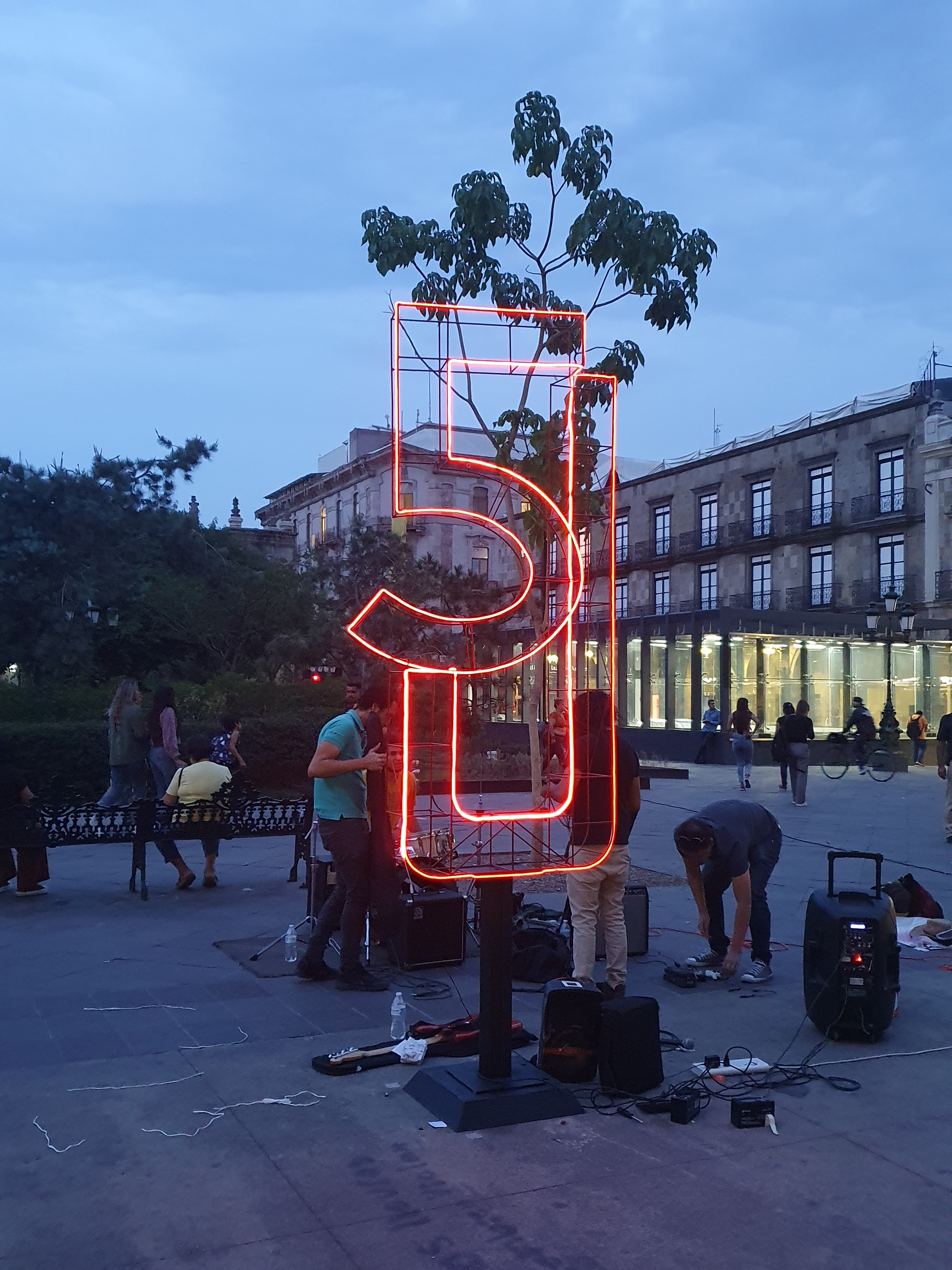
The replica on the day of its installment

The collectives #5deJunioMemoria and the Centro de Justicia para la Paz y el Desarrollo filed a complaint with the Office of the United Nations High Commissioner for Human Rights regarding the removal of the anti-monument and other acts of repression carried out by the state authorities. They also filed a complaint before the First Collegiate Court in Administrative Matters of Jalisco. In July 2023, a judge issued an order for the suculpture's reinstallation. Additionally, the state's branch of the National Institute of Anthropology and History indicated that reinstalling the artwork would not pose any risks to historical heritage.

Lemus stated that because there had been no official request for the anti-monument to be returned to its owner, the state would not release it. He added that once the application for reinstallation was submitted, consultations with state civil protection would determine whether it was safe to place the monument. Days later, the Director of the State Unit of Civil Protection and Firefighters rejected the idea of reinstalling the sculpture. He raised concerns that there were no technical studies ensuring public safety, that the sculpture's foundation could pose a problem, and that, being made of steel, it could cause electrical issues due to the proximity of the Urban Electric Train System under the square. As of July 2023, the authorities have yet to comply with the reinstatement orders.

On 5 July 2023, the collectives installed a light replica; it is made of rods and LED lights. It stands one meter (3 ft 3 in) shorter than the original, weighs less, and is designed to be removable. The installation was part of their efforts to maintain the anti-monument's presence while dealing with the authorities' refusal to reinstall the original sculpture.

== See also ==
- LED art
