= Cabinet of Pablo Lemus =

Cabinet of Governor of Jalisco, Pablo Lemus Navarro

Cabinet of Pablo Lemus Navarro
- Cabinet of State of Jalisco
- Date formed: 6 December 2024

People and organisations
- Governor: Pablo Lemus Navarro
- Governor's history: Former Municipal president of Guadalajara (2021–2023)
- No. of ministers: 21
- Total no. of members: 40
- Member party: Citizens' Movement
- Status in legislature: Divided government (2024–2027)
- Opposition party: Morena PAN PRI

History
- Election: Elecciones estatales de Jalisco de 2024
- Legislature terms: 64th Jalisco Legislature (01/11/2024–31/10/2027); 65th Jalisco Legislature (01/11/2027–31/10/2030)
- Budgets: 2025 Total State Budget: 172,960,330,567 pesos 2026 Total State Budget: 182,692,026,515 pesos
- Advice and consent: Congress of the State of Jalisco
- Predecessor: Cabinet of Enrique Alfaro Ramírez

Pablo Lemus Navarro assumed office as Governor of the State of Jalisco on 6 December 2024, and his term will end on 5 December 2030. The governor has the authority to nominate members of his Cabinet of the State of Jalisco, as per the Ley Orgánica del Poder Ejecutivo del Estado de Jalisco, Article 4, Section V.

== Background ==
On 2 June 2024, the state election to renew the governorship of Jalisco was held, resulting in Pablo Lemus, candidate of the Citizens' Movement party, as the winner with 44.25% of the votes.

On 16 October 2024, the Federal Electoral Tribunal ratified the victory of Pablo Lemus, for the period between 6 December 2024 and 5 December 2030.

== Reform of the State Public Administration ==
After his victory for the governorship of Jalisco, Pablo Lemus presented a proposal for reform to the state public administration before officially assuming office. This proposal was approved on 15 October 2024 and included the creation of two new secretariats:

- The Secretariat of Intelligence and Search for Persons; Secretaría de Inteligencia y Búsqueda de Personas (SIBP), focused on transforming the public security system through intelligence, data analysis and inter-institutional coordination.
- The Secretariat of Sustainable Energy Development; Secretaría de Desarrollo Energético Sustentable, aimed at promoting policies and actions for efficient and sustainable management of energy in the entity.

== Cabinet ==
=== Secretariats of State ===
Secretariat	Holder	Term	Political party
Secretaría General de Gobierno General Secretariat of Government	Carlos Arias Madrid	25/10/2026–	PAN
Secretaría General de Gobierno General Secretariat of Government	Salvador Zamora Zamora	06/12/2024–25/10/2026	MC
Secretaría de Administración; Secretariat of Administration	Rafael Orendáin Parra	06/12/2024–	Unaffiliated
Secretaría de la Hacienda Pública (SHP) Secretariat of Public Finance	Luis García Sotelo	06/12/2024–	Unaffiliated
Secretaría de Desarrollo Económico; Secretariat of Economic Development	Cindy Blanco	06/12/2024–	Unaffiliated
Secretaría de Agricultura y Desarrollo Rural Secretariat of Agriculture and Rural Development	Eduardo Ron Ramos	06/12/2024–	Unaffiliated
Secretaría de Educación; Secretariat of Education	Juan Carlos Flores Miramontes	06/12/2024–	MC
Secretaría de Infraestructura y Obra Pública; Secretariat of Infrastructure and Public Works	David Miguel Zamora Bueno	06/12/2024–	Unaffiliated
Secretaría de Innovación, Ciencia y Tecnología Secretariat of Innovation, Science and Technology	Fanny Guadalupe Valdivia Márquez	01/02/2026–	MC
Secretaría de Innovación, Ciencia y Tecnología Secretariat of Innovation, Science and Technology	Horacio Fernández Castillo	06/12/2024–31/01/2026	Unaffiliated
Secretaría de Salud Secretariat of Health	Héctor Raúl Pérez Gómez	06/12/2024–	Unaffiliated
Secretaría de Trabajo y Previsión Social Secretariat of Labor and Social Prevision	Ricardo Barbosa	06/12/2024–	Unaffiliated
Secretaría de Transporte Secretariat of Transportation	Diego Monraz Villaseñor	06/12/2024–	MC
Secretaría de Seguridad Secretariat of Security	Juan Pablo Hernández	06/12/2024–	Unaffiliated
Secretaría de Desarrollo Energético Sustentable Secretariat of Sustainable Energy Development	Manuel Herrera Vega	06/12/2024–	MC
Secretaría de Medio Ambiente y Desarrollo Territorial Secretariat of Environment and Territorial Development	Paola Bauche Petersen	06/12/2024–	Unaffiliated
Secretaría de la Gestión Integral del Agua Secretariat for Integrated Water Management	Ernesto Marroquín	06/12/2024–	Unaffiliated
Secretaría de Cultura Secretariat of Culture	Gerardo Ascencio	06/12/2024–	Unaffiliated
Secretaría de Turismo Secretariat of Tourism	Michelle Fridman	06/12/2024–	Unaffiliated
Secretaría de Inteligencia y Búsqueda de Personas Secretariat of Intelligence and Search for Persons	Edna Montoya	06/12/2024–	Unaffiliated
Secretaría de Planeación y Participación Ciudadana Secretariat of Planning and Citizen Participation	Cynthia Cantero	06/12/2024–	Unaffiliated
Secretaría de Sistema de Asistencia Social Secretariat of Social Assistance System	Priscilla Franco Barba	06/12/2024–	MC
Secretaría de Igualdad Sustantiva entre Mujeres y Hombres Secretariat for Substantive Equality between Women and Men	Fabiola Loya Hernández	06/12/2024–	MC; Unaffiliated

== Expanded Cabinet ==
=== Dependencies ===
Dependency	Holder	Term	Political party
Jefatura de Gabinete Chief of Staff	Alberto Esquer Gutiérrez	06/12/2024–	MC
Fiscalía General del Estado State Attorney General's Office	Salvador González de los Santos	06/12/2024–	Unaffiliated
Contraloría del Estado Comptrollership of the State	María Teresa Brito Serrano	06/12/2024–	Unaffiliated
Procuraduría Social Social Attorney	Héctor Pizano Ramos	06/12/2024–	MC

=== Decentralized and deconcentrated public bodies ===
Body	Holder	Term	Political party
National System for Integral Family Development Sistema Nacional para el Desarrollo Integral de la Familia	Maye Villa de Lemus	06/12/2024–	MC
Sistema Intermunicipal de los Servicios de Agua Potable y Alcantarillado (SIAPA) Intermunicipal System of Drinking Water and Sewerage Services	Ismael Jáuregui Castañeda	23/03/2026–	Unaffiliated
Sistema Intermunicipal de los Servicios de Agua Potable y Alcantarillado (SIAPA) Intermunicipal System of Drinking Water and Sewerage Services	Antonio Juárez Trueba	06/12/2024–22/03/2026	Unaffiliated
Centro de Conciliación Laboral Center for Labor Conciliation	Elke Tepper García	06/12/2024–	Unaffiliated
Instituto de Información, Estadística y Geografía (IIEG) Institute of Information, Statistics and Geography	Abigaíl Rizo de la Torre	06/12/2024–	Unaffiliated
Sistema Jalisciense de Radio y Televisión (SJRTV) Jalisco Radio and Television System	Gabriela Aguilar	06/12/2024–	Unaffiliated
Red de Centros de Justicia para las Mujeres Network of Women's Justice Centers	Sofía Berenice García	06/12/2024–	Unaffiliated
Instituto de Pensiones del Estado de Jalisco Jalisco State Pension Institute	Fernando Quesada Gómez	01/07/2026–	Unaffiliated
Instituto de Pensiones del Estado de Jalisco Jalisco State Pension Institute	Juan Partida Morales	06/12/2024–30/06/2026	MC

=== Office of Government ===
Dependency	Holder	Term	Political party
Consejería Jurídica Legal Counsel	Tatiana Anaya Zúñiga	06/12/2024–	Unaffiliated
Consejo Asesor para la Política de Salud Pública Advisory Council for Public Health Policy	Salomón Chertorivski Woldenberg	06/12/2024–	MC
Consejo Consultivo del Agua Water Advisory Council	Francisco Javier Mayorga Castañeda	06/12/2024–	PAN

== Coordinations ==
Coordination	Holder	Term	Political party
Coordinación General Estratégica de Seguridad General Strategic Coordination of Security	Roberto Alarcón Estrada	06/12/2024–	Unaffiliated
Coordinación General Estratégica de Crecimiento y Desarrollo Económico General Strategic Coordination of Economic Growth and Development	Mauro Garza Marín	06/12/2024–	MC
Coordinación General Estratégica de Desarrollo Social General Strategic Coordination of Social Development	Andrea Blanco Calderón	06/12/2024–	Unaffiliated
Coordinación General Estratégica de Gestión del Territorio General Strategic Coordination of Territorial Management	Karina Hermosillo	06/12/2024–	Unaffiliated
Coordinación General de Análisis Estratégico y Comunicación General Coordination of Strategic Analysis and Communication	José David Estrada Ruiz Velasco	06/12/2024–	Unaffiliated
