= Cabinet of Enrique Alfaro Ramírez =

Cabinet of former Governor of Jalisco, Enrique Alfaro Ramírez

- Cabinet of State of Jalisco
- Date formed: 6 December 2018
- Date dissolved: 5 December 2024

People and organisations
- Governor: Enrique Alfaro Ramírez
- Governor's history: Former Municipal president of Guadalajara (2015–2017)
- No. of ministers: 19
- Total no. of members: 27
- Member party: Citizens' Movement
- Status in legislature: Divided government (2018–2021); Divided government (2015–2018)
- Opposition party: PAN; Morena; PRI

History
- Election: Elecciones estatales de Jalisco de 2018
- Legislature terms: 62th Jalisco Legislature (01/11/2018–31/10/2021); 63th Jalisco Legislature (01/11/2021–31/10/2024)
- Budgets: 2019 Total State Budget: 116,946,234,556 pesos 2020 Total State Budget: 123,013,287,976 pesos 2021 Total State Budget: 124,280,890,182 pesos 2022 Total State Budget: 137,286,506,887 pesos 2023 Total State Budget: 158,860,431,006 pesos 2024 Total State Budget: 167,116,183,468 pesos
- Advice and consent: Congress of the State of Jalisco
- Predecessor: Cabinet of Aristóteles Sandoval
- Successor: Cabinet of Pablo Lemus Navarro

Enrique Alfaro Ramírez assumed office as Governor of the State of Jalisco on 6 December 2018, and his term ended on 5 December 2024. The governor has the authority to nominate members of his Cabinet of the State of Jalisco, as per the Ley Orgánica del Poder Ejecutivo del Estado de Jalisco, Article 4, Section V.

== Cabinet ==
=== Secretariats of State ===
Secretariat	Holder	Term	Political party
Secretaría General de Gobierno; General Secretariat of Government	Enrique Ibarra Pedroza	06/12/2018–05/12/2024	MC
Secretaría de la Hacienda Pública (SHP) Secretariat of Public Finance	Juan Partida Morales	06/12/2018–05/12/2024	Unaffiliated
Secretaría de Administración; Secretariat of Administration	Esteban Petersen Cortés; Ricardo Rodríguez Jiménez; Aarón Armando Gámez Sepúlveda	06/12/2018–31/08/2021; 01/09/2021–30/09/2024; 01/10/2024–05/12/2024	Unaffiliated; Unaffiliated; Unaffiliated
Secretaría de Infraestructura y Obra Pública; Secretariat of Infrastructure and Public Works	David Miguel Zamora Bueno	06/12/2018–05/12/2024	Unaffiliated
Secretaría de Desarrollo Económico; Secretariat of Economic Development	Ernesto Sánchez Proal; Diedra González Free; Luis Roberto Arechederra Pacheco	06/12/2018–30/08/2021; 01/09/2021–31/10/2021; 01/11/2021–05/12/2024	Unaffiliated; Unaffiliated; Unaffiliated
Secretaría de Educación; Secretariat of Education	Juan Carlos Flores MiramontesJuan Carlos Flores Miramontes	06/12/2018–05/12/2024	Unaffiliated
Secretaría de Seguridad Secretariat of Security	Juan Bosco Agustín Pacheco Medrano	06/12/2018–05/12/2024	Unaffiliated
Secretaría de Salud Secretariat of Health	Fernando Petersen Aranguren	06/12/2018–05/12/2024	Unaffiliated
Secretaría de Agricultura y Desarrollo Rural Secretariat of Agriculture and Rural Development	Alberto Esquer Gutiérrez; Salvador Álvarez García; Ana Lucía Camacho Sevilla	06/12/2018–27/01/2021; 27/01/2021–31/10/2021; 01/11/2021–05/12/2024	MC; MC; MC
Secretaría de Sistema Asistencia Social Secretariat of Social Assistance System	José Miguel Santos Zepeda; Alberto Esquer Gutiérrez; Fabiola Loya Hernández	06/12/2018–27/01/2021; 27/01/2021–30/11/2023; 01/12/2023–05/12/2024	Unaffiliated; MC; MC
Secretaría de Medio Ambiente y Desarrollo Territorial Secretariat of Environment and Territorial Development	Sergio Humberto Graf Montero; Jorge Israel García Ochoa	06/12/2018–16/09/2022; 01/10/2022–05/12/2024	Unaffiliated; Unaffiliated
Secretaría de Transporte Secretariat of Transportation	Diego Monraz Villaseñor	06/12/2018–05/12/2024	MC
Secretaría de Trabajo y Previsión Social Secretariat of Labor and Social Prevision	Marco Valerio Pérez Gollaz	06/12/2018–05/12/2024	MC
Secretaría de Innovación, Ciencia y Tecnología Secretariat of Innovation, Science and Technology	Alfonso Pompa Padilla	06/12/2018–05/12/2024	Unaffiliated
Secretaría de Turismo Secretariat of Tourism	Claudia Vanessa Pérez Lamas	06/12/2018–31/10/2021; 01/11/2021–05/12/2024	Unaffiliated; MC
Secretaría de la Gestión Integral del Agua Secretariat for Integrated Water Management	Jorge Gastón González Alcérreca	06/12/2018–05/12/2024	Unaffiliated
Secretaría de Cultura Secretariat of Culture	Giovana Elizabeth Jaspersen García; Susana Chávez Brandon; Lourdes Ariadna González Pérez	06/12/2018–01/02/2021; 05/02/2021–15/06/2021; 16/06/2021–05/12/2024	Unaffiliated; Unaffiliated; Unaffiliated
Secretaría de Planeación y Participación Ciudadana Secretariat of Planning and Citizen Participation	Margarita Sierra Díaz de Rivera	06/12/2018–05/12/2024	Unaffiliated
Secretaría de Igualdad Sustantiva entre Mujeres y Hombres Secretariat for Substantive Equality between Women and Men	Fela Patricia Pelayo López; Paola Lazo Corvera	06/12/2018–20/07/2020; 25/08/2020–05/12/2024	MC; Unaffiliated

== Expanded Cabinet ==
=== Dependencies ===
Dependency	Holder	Term	Political party
Jefatura de Gabinete Chief of Staff	Hugo Manuel Luna Vázquez	06/12/2018–05/12/2024	MC
Fiscalía General del Estado State Attorney General's Office	Gerardo Solís Gómez; Luis Joaquín Méndez Ruiz	06/12/2018–02/02/2022; 03/02/2022–05/12/2024	Unaffiliated; Unaffiliated
Contraloría del Estado Comptrollership of the State	María Teresa Brito Serrano	06/12/2018–05/12/2024	Unaffiliated
Procuraduría Social Social Attorney	Juan Carlos Márquez Rosas; Eduardo Trujillo Mendoza; Edgar Israel Orozco Montes	06/12/2018–30/11/2023; 01/12/2023–15/04/2024; 16/04/2024–05/12/2024	MC; Unaffiliated; Unaffiliated

== Coordinations ==
Coordinación General Estratégica de Seguridad General Strategic Coordination of Security	Macedonio Tamez Guajardo; Ricardo Sánchez Beruben	06/12/2018–07/07/2020; 09/07/2020–05/12/2024	MC; Unaffiliated
Coordinación General Estratégica de Crecimiento y Desarrollo Económico General Strategic Coordination of Economic Growth and Development	Alejandro Guzmán Larralde; Xavier Orendáin de Obeso	06/12/2018–31/08/2021; 01/09/2021–05/12/2024	Unaffiliated; Unaffiliated
Coordinación General Estratégica de Desarrollo Social General Strategic Coordination of Social Development	Anna Bárbara Casillas García	06/12/2018–05/12/2024	MC
Coordinación General Estratégica de Gestión del Territorio General Strategic Coordination of Territorial Management	Patricia Martínez Barba; René Caro Gómez	06/12/2018–01/10/2022; 01/10/2022–05/12/2024	Unaffiliated; Unaffiliated
