= Death of Giovanni López =

2020 police killing of a man in Mexico

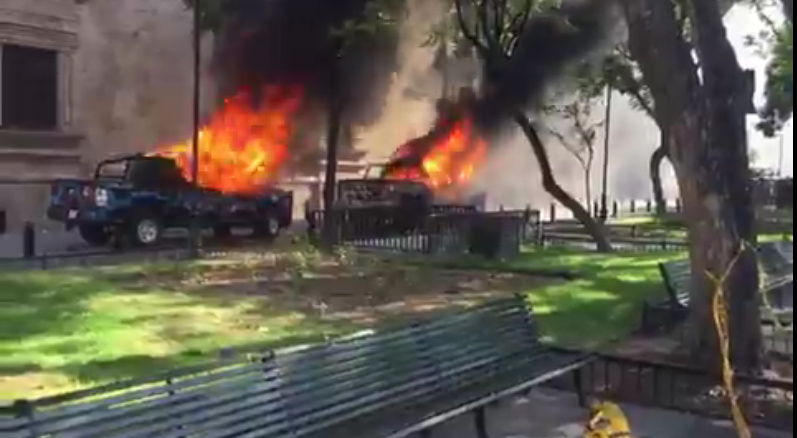
- Two police cars set on fire in protest over the death of Giovanni López in Guadalajara.
- Date: 4 May 2020
- Location: Ixtlahuacán de los Membrillos, Jalisco, Mexico

The death of Giovanni López Ramírez occurred on 4 May 2020, in the municipality of Ixtlahuacán de los Membrillos, Jalisco, Mexico as a result of his arrest by police officers. He was allegedly arrested for not wearing a face mask during the COVID-19 pandemic in Mexico. He died at a hospital with traumatic brain injury and with a gunshot wound to his leg. Public outcry over his death erupted one month later, due to a video of his arrest going viral on social media and inspired by the George Floyd protests. Protests against police brutality began in Jalisco on 4 June 2020, and spread to other areas in Mexico.

The Attorney General of Jalisco has announced that three police officers from Ixtlahuacán de los Membrillos were arrested on 5 June 2020, for the murder of Giovanni López.

== Giovanni López ==
Giovanni López Ramírez (1990-2020) was a thirty-year-old bricklayer who lived in Ixtlahuacán de los Membrillos.

== Arrest and death ==
Giovanni's brother, Christian Daniel López Ramírez, recorded the moment when police arrested his brother on 4 May 2020. He was arrested in front of the López family home, allegedly for not wearing a face mask. After his brother's arrest, Christian has stated that he and his neighbors called the mayor, who told them that they could pick up their brother the next day at approximately 10:00 a.m.

The next day, on 5 May 2020, López's family went to the municipal jail to get Giovanni, when they were told he was at the Guadalajara Civil Hospital. Giovanni's aunt has said that the police at the jail told her that Giovanni was at the hospital because "se les había pasado la mano" (roughly meaning "they went heavy handed"), an expression in Spanish suggesting that the police had used excessive force. At the hospital, they were told that Giovanni had died of traumatic brain injury. He also had lesions and a gunshot wound to his left leg.

== Aftermath ==
Giovanni's brother did not release the video of his brother's arrest until one month later. He has accused the mayor of Ixtlahuacán, Eduardo Cervantes Aguilar, of offering his family $200,000 pesos (approximately US$9,300) to not release the video of Giovanni's arrest and also claims that the mayor threatened to have his family killed if the video was released. The mayor has denied the accusations.

In the following days of the arrest video being released, hundreds of young people gathered in downtown Guadalajara, painting graffiti, breaking windows, and trying to force their way into the government palace. The police responded with tear gas, and two patrol cars were burned. Police officer Rodolfo Essaú was set on fire; his condition was later reported as stable. At least 28 people were detained for protesting.

== Reactions ==
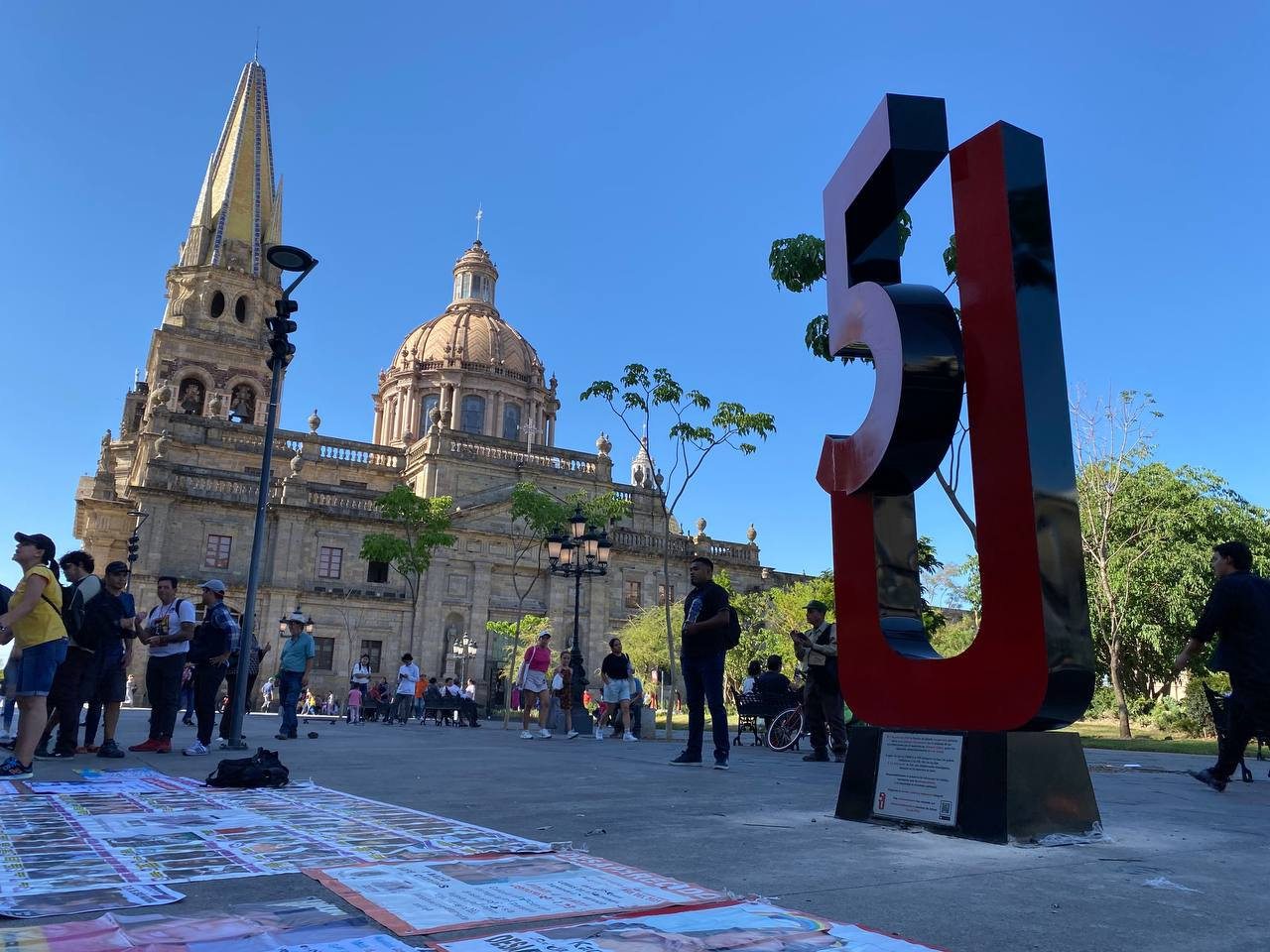
Antimonumento 5J, placed to commemorate the protests' repression

The governor of Jalisco, Enrique Alfaro Ramírez, stated that López's arrest had nothing to do with a face mask.

Mexican President Andrés Manuel López Obrador has spoken about the incident, stating that he will "not interfere with the case to avoid partisan conflicts."

Mexican actress Salma Hayek posted a photograph on Instagram protesting against the murder of López. Mexican director Guillermo del Toro has also condemned the killing of Giovanni López on social media. Other celebrities decrying the death of López included the Mexican band Molotov and Mexican actress Zuria Vega.

The Mexican branch of the Office of the United Nations High Commissioner for Human Rights condemned López's death and called for an independent investigation.

People called for justice for Giovanni using the hashtag #JusticiaParaGiovanni (#JusticeForGiovanni).
