= Hotel Francés =

Historic hotel in Guadalajara, Mexico

Coordinates: 20°40′34″N 103°20′44″W

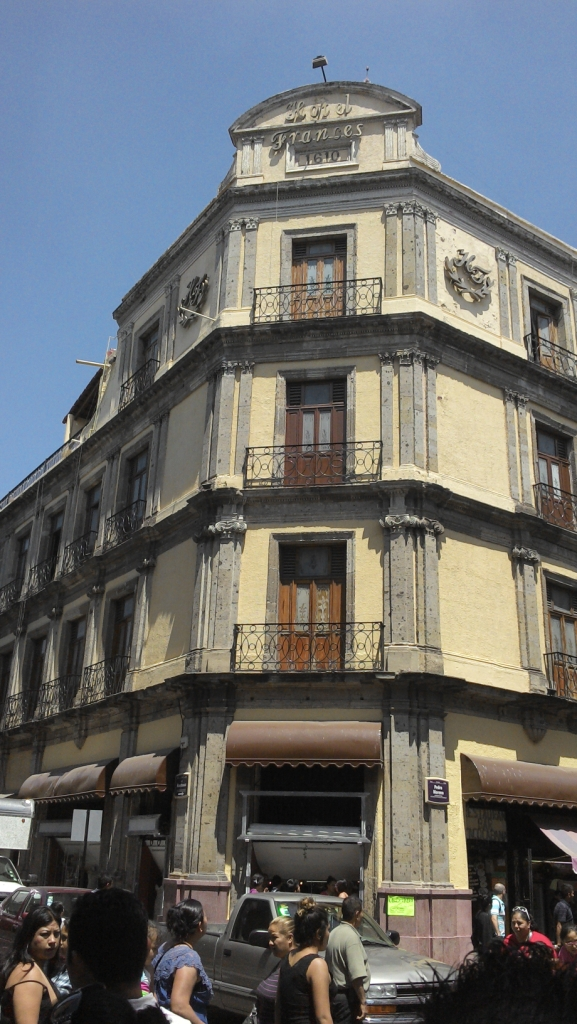
- The hotel in Guadalajara's historic centre
- Interactive map of the Hotel Francés area

General information
- Location: Maestranza 35, Centro, Guadalajara, Jalisco, Mexico
- Opened: 1610

Design and construction
- Architect: Jacobo Gálvez

Website
- www.hotelfrances.com

The Hotel Francés is a historic hotel in Centro, Guadalajara, Mexico, behind the Palacio de Gobierno de Jalisco. Founded in 1610, it is the oldest hotel in the city. The building is listed as a historic monument by the Instituto Nacional de Antropología e Historia (INAH). Its courtyard and elevator, one of the oldest in the city, are among its notable features.

== History ==
Opened in 1610 as Guadalajara's first lodging establishment, the hotel has undergone numerous renovations while preserving its viceregal architecture. The current building was erected in the mid-19th century by architect Jacobo Gálvez.

Over the course of its history, the hotel has hosted artists, politicians, writers, and liberal leaders, including Benito Juárez. During the Second French intervention in Mexico, it was known as the Hotel Hidalgo. Historian Luis Pérez Verdía used the basement, where a printing press was installed, to publish his books on the history of Mexico. On 31 July 1982, Governor Flavio Romero de Velasco designated the hotel a national monument. The building was also known as the Hotel Humboldt.
