= Plaza de Armas (Guadalajara) =

Urban square in Guadalajara, Jalisco, Mexico

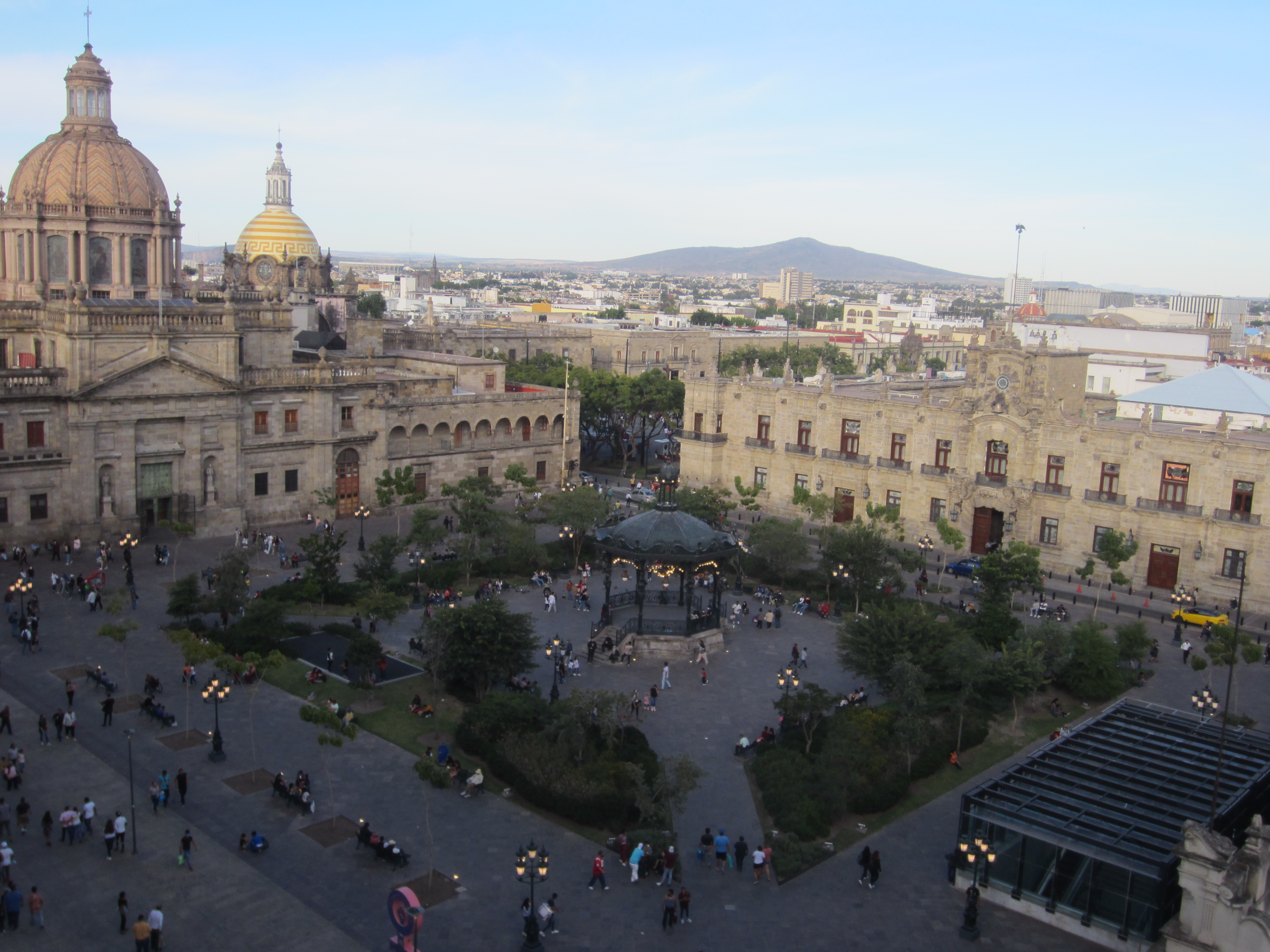
- The square in 2021
- Location: Guadalajara, Jalisco, Mexico
- Location within Jalisco
- Coordinates: 20°40′34.5″N 103°20′49″W

Plaza de Armas is an urban square in Centro, Guadalajara, in the Mexican state of Jalisco.

Guadalajara Cathedral and the Palacio de Gobierno de Jalisco border the square.

== See also ==
- Antimonumenta (Guadalajara)
- Antimonumento 5J
- Guadalajara Centro railway station, a light train station below the plaza
