= Ángel Romero (cyclist) =

Mexican cyclist (1932–2007)

Ángel Romero Llamas
Personal information
- Born: 1 October 1932 Teúl de González Ortega, Mexico
- Died: 21 September 2007 (aged 74) Guadalajara, Mexico

Cycling career
- Sport: Cycling

Ángel Romero (1 October 1932 – 21 September 2007) was a Mexican cyclist and politician. He competed in the individual and team road race events at the 1952 Summer Olympics. He was also twice municipal president of Zapopan, 1961–1963 and 1974–1976.
