= Manuel Cuesta Gallardo =

Mexican politician, hacendado and engineer (1873–1920)

Governor of Jalisco
- In office 23 April 1911 – 24 May 1911
- Preceded by: Emiliano Robles
- Succeeded by: David Gutiérrez Allende
- In office 1 March 1911 – 19 April 1911
- Preceded by: Juan R. Zavala
- Succeeded by: Emiliano Robles

Personal details
- Born: Manuel Tiburcio Cástulo Joaquín Cuesta Gallardo; 14 April 1873 Guadalajara, Jalisco, Mexico
- Died: 2 December 1920 (aged 47) Mexico City, Mexico
- Party: Círculo Nacional Porfirista
- Spouse: Victoria Gómez Rubio (m. 1917)
- Parents: Josefa Gallardo Riesch; Manuel María Cuesta Castillo
- Occupation: engineer; hacendado; farmer; politician

Theater at 99 López Cotilla Street
- Interactive map of Theater at 99 López Cotilla Street
- Coordinates: 20°23′51″N 103°8′7″W

Manuel Cuesta Gallardo (14 April 1873 – 2 December 1920) was a Mexican engineer and landowner, Constitutional Governor of Jalisco, during two brief periods in 1911, which totaled 80 days, in the final stretch of the dictatorial regime of Porfirio Díaz.

== Biography ==
He was born in Guadalajara, on 14 April 1873, into a wealthy Jalisco family of landowners. He was the first in a family of ten children, seven men and three women, heirs of the Hacienda of Atequiza, located in the town of the same name, in Jalisco.

His maternal grandfather, Cástulo Gallardo y González de Hermosillo (married on 3 February 1841 to María Francisca Riesch Mallén), had purchased the Hacienda de Atequiza in 1839, north of the town of Atequiza and south of Río Grande de Santiago, in Jalisco. In 1900 the Cuesta Gallardo estate had 31 743 acres (12 846 hectares); 19 768 acres (8000 hectares) were irrigated. There they planted beans, corn, wheat, barley, and sugar cane; they had cattle and horses, in addition to owning and operating a wheat mill equipped with state-of-the-art German technology.

From 1870 to 1900, the Cuesta Gallardo family built a private theater, still standing in 2024, at 99 López Cotilla Street, currently the seat of the House of Culture of the Delegation of Atequiza; the La Florida estate, and the church bell tower, as well as making improvements to the main house. During the hacienda's heyday, from 1839 to 1903, the property was located in the municipality of Poncitlán. On 15 January 1938, the Atequiza commissaryship became part of the municipality of Ixtlahuacán de los Membrillos, segregated from the former, according to decree 4349.

A stately estate in Guadalajara, known as the Casa de los Abanicos (House of Fans), located at 1823 Libertad Avenue on the corner of Moscú Street, Colonia Americana, was owned by the landowner and former governor Manuel Cuesta Gallardo, who acquired it in March 1907, by paying 30 000 pesos, when it was four years after being built by architect Guillermo de Alba y Gómez de la Peña. Cuesta Gallardo commissioned the German engineer Ernesto Fuchs to make several improvements. Later it was the headquarters of the ITESO; thereafter, the University Club, and in 2024 it is an event venue.

In 1911 the era of the Porfiriato came to an end. Manuel Cuesta Gallardo, the last Porfirist governor of Jalisco, resigned. He was succeeded by David Gutiérrez Allende on 25 May 1911. On 27 February 1915, Pancho Villa ordered the murder of former governor Manuel's brother, Joaquín Cuesta Gallardo (13 September 1874 – 27 February 1915), accused by the steward of the Hacienda Maltaraña, owned by Joaquín, of being the main and worst cacique (political boss) of La Barca, Jalisco.

The Regional Museum of Guadalajara exhibits an oil easel painting, of the former governor of Jalisco Manuel Cuesta Gallardo.

== Tribute ==
42nd Street in the Sector Libertad of Guadalajara bears the name «Manuel Cuesta Gallardo».
