= List of municipal presidents of Zapopan =

Following is a list of municipal presidents of Zapopan, in the Mexican state of Jalisco:

Term	Municipal president	Political party	Notes
1821	Antonio Francisco Delgado		
1861	Antonio Pérez		
1866	Librado Bolaños		
1870	Manuel Rasura		
1871	José María Meza		
1879	Antonio de P. González		
1880	Isidro Orozco		
1881	Victoriano Orozco		
1885	Juan de Dios Orozco		
1886	Miguel Morales		
1887	Víctor Orozco		
1888	Agustín Escobedo		
1889	Alberto Toscano		
1893	José María Gutiérrez		
1894	José María Mendoza		
1896	Carlos L. Marrón		
1897	Alfonso García		
1899	Jesús Torres		
1900	Dolores Plascencia		
1901	Ignacio Vizcaíno		
1901	Rafael Orozco		
1901	Alfonso García		
1901	Rodolfo G. Torres		
1902	Jesús Calderón		
1902	Carlos C. García		
1902–1903	Guillermo Medina		
1903	Carlos M. Gallardo		
1903	Tomás García		
1903–1904	Filiberto Briseño		
1904	Francisco Calleja		
1905–1906	Salvador S. Díaz		
1906	Manuel Argaiz		
1906	Luis Merino		
1906–1907	Esteban Soto Ruiz		
1907	José A. Castañeda		
1907	José M. Meza		
1907	Valente Carrillo y Sandi		
1908	José A. Castañeda		
1909	Antonio Reynoso		
1909–1910	Faustino S. Garza		
1910–1911	Maximino Campos		
1911	Manuel Argaiz		
1911	Alejandro Aviña		
1911	Rafael Orozco		
1911	Alejandro C. Sánchez O.		
1911	Mateo de León		
1911	Pedro G. Bango		
1911–1912	Serafín de la Torre		
1912	Pedro Cantú		
1912	Salvador M. Fernández		
1913	Salvador M. Fernández		
1913	Benjamín García		
1913–1914	Salvador M. Fernández		
1914–1915	Carlos M. Tello		
1915	Sabino G. Padilla		
1915	Alberto Fernández		
1915	Leonardo Orozco		
1915–1916	José Hernández Benítez		
1916	Ramón M. Sotomayor		
1917	Alfredo Herrera		
1918–1919	Felipe González Rubio		
1919	Jesús Velarde		
1919	Beningno T. Magdaleno		
1920	J. Jesús Ramírez		
1920	Paulino Orendáin		
1920	Vicente Rubio		
1920	Paulino Orendáin		
1920	Benigno T. Magdaleno		
1920–1921	Alberto Fernández		
1921	José Abel Orozco		
1921–1922	Manuel Morales		
1922–1923	Macario S. Hernández		
1924–1928	Salvador de la Mora		
1928	Adrián Morales		
1928	Ramón Salcido		
1928	Antonio Armas		
1928–1929	José Refugio Sánchez		
1929–1930	Librado Gutiérrez Chávez	PNR	
1931	Felipe González Rubio	PNR	
1931	Miguel Vázquez	PNR	
1932–1933	Carlos Rodríguez	PNR	
1934	Manuel Camarena	PNR	
1935–1936	Porfirio Encarnación A.	PNR	
1937–1938	Samuel Godínez Aguayo	PNR	
1939–1940	J. Loreto Orozco Gutiérrez	PRM	
1941	J. Abel Orozco	PRM	
1941–1942	Filiberto González González	PRM	
1943–1944	Rafael Gómez García	PRM	
1945–1946	Rodolfo Núñez Gutiérrez	PRM	
1947–1948	Ricardo Orozco Gutiérrez	PRI	
1949–1952	Eliseo Orozco Gutiérrez	PRI	
1953	Luis Robles Santiago	PRI	
1954–1955	Toribio Hernández Orozco	PRI	
1956–1958	Inocencio Figueroa Serrano	PRI	
1959–1961	Augusto Ceseña Ceseña	PRI	
1961–1963	Ángel Romero Llamas	PRI	
1964	Abel Galván Galván	PRI	
1965–1967	Bernardo Gutiérrez Ochoa	PRI	
1968–1970	Juan Manuel Ruvalcaba de la Mora	PRI	
1970	Darío López Rodríguez	PRI	
1971–1973	Constancio Hernández Allende	PRI	
1974–1976	Ángel Romero Llamas	PRI	
01/01/1977–09/08/1979	Abel Salgado Velasco	PRI	Applied for a leave for an indefinite period
09/08/1979-31/12/1979	Albino Quirarte Arana	PRI	Acting municipal president
01/01/1980–1982	Ricardo Chávez Pérez	PRI	
1982	Jorge Ramón Quiñones Ruiz	PRI	Acting municipal president
1983–1985	Alberto Mora López	PRI	
1986–1988	Juan José Bañuelos Guardado	PRI	
1989–1990	Carlos Rivera Aceves	PRI	
1990–1992	Nicolás Orozco Ramírez	PRI	
1992–1995	Jorge Humberto Chavira Martínez	PRI	
1995–26/07/1996	Daniel Ituarte Reynaud	PAN	He applied for license due to the threat of being impeached because of nepotism
27/07/1996–09/09/1996	Heraclio Reséndiz Sañudo	PAN	In charge of matters
10/09/1996–31/12/1997	José María Hernández Quintero	PAN	Acting municipal president
01/01/1998–31/12/2000	José Cornelio Ramírez Acuña	PAN	
01/01/2001–31/12/2003	Macedonio Salomón Tamez Guajardo	PAN	
01/01/2004–2005	Arturo Zamora Jiménez	PRI	
2005–31/12/2006	Ismael Orozco Loreto	PRI	Acting municipal president
01/01/2007–31/12/2009	Juan Sánchez Aldana Ramírez	PAN	
01/01/2010–20/01/2012	Héctor Vielma Ordóñez	PRI	
21/01/2012–17/02/2012	Karla Torres Cervantes	PRI	Acting municipal president
18/02/2012–30/09/2012	Héctor Vielma Ordóñez	PRI	Resumed
01/10/2012–30/09/2015	Héctor Robles Peiro	PRI	
01/10/2015–20/03/2018	Pablo Lemus Navarro	MC	
21/03/2018–09/08/2018	José Luis Tostado Bastidas	MC	Acting municipal president
10/08/2018–30/09/2018	Pablo Lemus Navarro	MC	Resumed to conclude his first triennium
01/10/2018–26/02/2021	Pablo Lemus Navarro	MC	He was reelected on 01/07/2018, started his second triennium on 01/10/2018
27/02/2021–05/09/2021	Graciela de Obaldía Escalante	MC	Acting municipal president
06/09/2021–30/09/2021	Pablo Lemus Navarro	MC	Resumed
01/10/2021–12/02/2024	Juan José Frangie	MC	Applied for a leave, in order to run for reelection
12/02/2024–20/08/2024	Ana Isaura Amador Nieto	MC	Acting municipal president
21/08/2024–30/09/2024	Juan José Frangie Saade	MC	He resumed, in order to end his first triennium
01/10/2024–	Juan José Frangie Saade	MC	He was reelected on 2 June 2024
