= Pablo Lemus =

Mexican politician (born 1969)

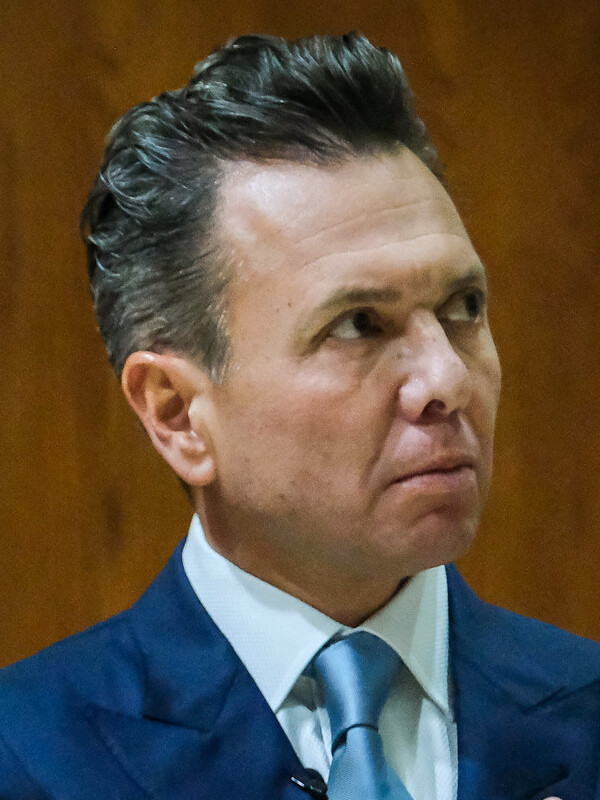
- Lemus Navarro in 2025

Governor of Jalisco
- Incumbent
- Assumed office 6 December 2024
- Preceded by: Enrique Alfaro Ramírez

Mayor of Guadalajara
- In office 1 October 2021 – 27 October 2023
- Preceded by: Ramiro Hernández García
- Succeeded by: Enrique Ibarra Pedroza

Mayor of Zapopan
- In office 1 October 2015 – 30 September 2021
- Preceded by: Héctor Robles Peiro
- Succeeded by: Juan José Frangie

Personal details
- Born: Jesús Pablo Lemus Navarro; 18 July 1969 (age 57) Guadalajara, Jalisco, Mexico
- Party: Citizens' Movement
- Spouse: Maye Villa
- Education: ITESO, Universidad Jesuita de Guadalajara; Panamerican University

Jesús Pablo Lemus Navarro (born 18 July 1969) is a Mexican politician, businessman and communicator. He was president of the Employers' Confederation of the Mexican Republic (COPARMEX) of Jalisco, general director of Credicampo and, from 2015 to 2021, mayor of Zapopan in Jalisco. From 2021 to 2023, he was municipal president of Guadalajara. He is the governor of Jalisco for the Citizens' Movement (MC), having been elected in the 2024 elections.

== Early life and education ==
Lemus was born in Guadalajara, Jalisco, on 18 July 1969, in a family dedicated to the musical instrument trade. He is married to Maye Villa, with whom he has four children. His uncle, Ramiro Navarro, represented Mexico at the 1966 FIFA World Cup.

Lemus completed a degree in Business Administration at the ITESO, Universidad Jesuita de Guadalajara. Upon completion, he continued with two postgraduate degrees, one in Finance at the Panamerican University and another in the specialty of Senior Business Management, at the Instituto Panamericano de Alta Dirección de Empresa.

== Professional career ==
As a businessman, Lemus began his career at the head of Musical Lemus, a company belonging to his family. He then joined the Board of Directors of Multivalores Grupo Financiero (currently Grupo Multiva) and, later, he would become a partner of Credicampo. He participated in COPARMEX as president of the Young Entrepreneurs Commission, and later became the director of said organization. During his administration, from 2008 to 2011, Lemus undertook reforms to combat corruption in various levels of government, in addition to promoting citizen participation with initiatives such as Reasoned Vote and Meet Your Deputy. On the other hand, he collaborated in various media outlets in the Guadalajara metropolitan area, first as a moderator in a local television program and then as the headline of a radio news program on the Zona 3 Noticias station. He was also a columnist in a newspaper.

== Political career ==
=== Mayor of Zapopan ===
Nominated by the MC, Lemus was elected Mayor of Zapopan by popular vote for the period 2015–2018, with a difference of 10 percentage points. He was sworn in as Municipal President on 1 October 2015. Almost two years later, on 27 August, he was ratified in office with an approval rating of 89 percent. From the beginning of his administration, he announced that he would focus on addressing the main social problems, caused by the inequality that prevails in the municipality.

With the aim of developing policies for the protection, security, development and well-being of minors, the Lemus administration embarked on an action plan, since 2016, to be the City of Children. Some actions carried out in favor of Zapopan society, especially for boys and girls, were the recovery of sports and recreational spaces, creation of social programs to prevent school dropouts, stimulating employment and promoting entrepreneurship, the construction of centers community with art workshops and the installation of the Rights Protection System for children and adolescents (SIPINNA).

=== Mayor of Guadalajara ===
In February 2021, Lemus requested a license as mayor of Zapopan to aspire to a multi-member council by the Citizens' Movement. During this process, he also confirmed that he would be in charge of coordinating the campaigns for the local councils of Jalisco.

On March 16, Ismael del Toro Castro, candidate for the presidency of Guadalajara, resigned from the electoral race for family reasons. Two days later, the leader of the Jalisco Citizens' Movement, Ricardo Rodríguez, presented Lemus as the new candidate for mayor. Lemus would be elected mayor and was sworn in on 1 October 2021. He resigned from the position on 27 October 2023 in order to run for governor of Jalisco.

=== Governor of Jalisco ===
On 2 June 2024, as part of the local elections, Lemus was elected governor of Jalisco.

== See also ==
- Cabinet of Pablo Lemus Navarro
