= Enrique Alfaro Ramírez =

Governor of Jalisco from 2018 to 2024

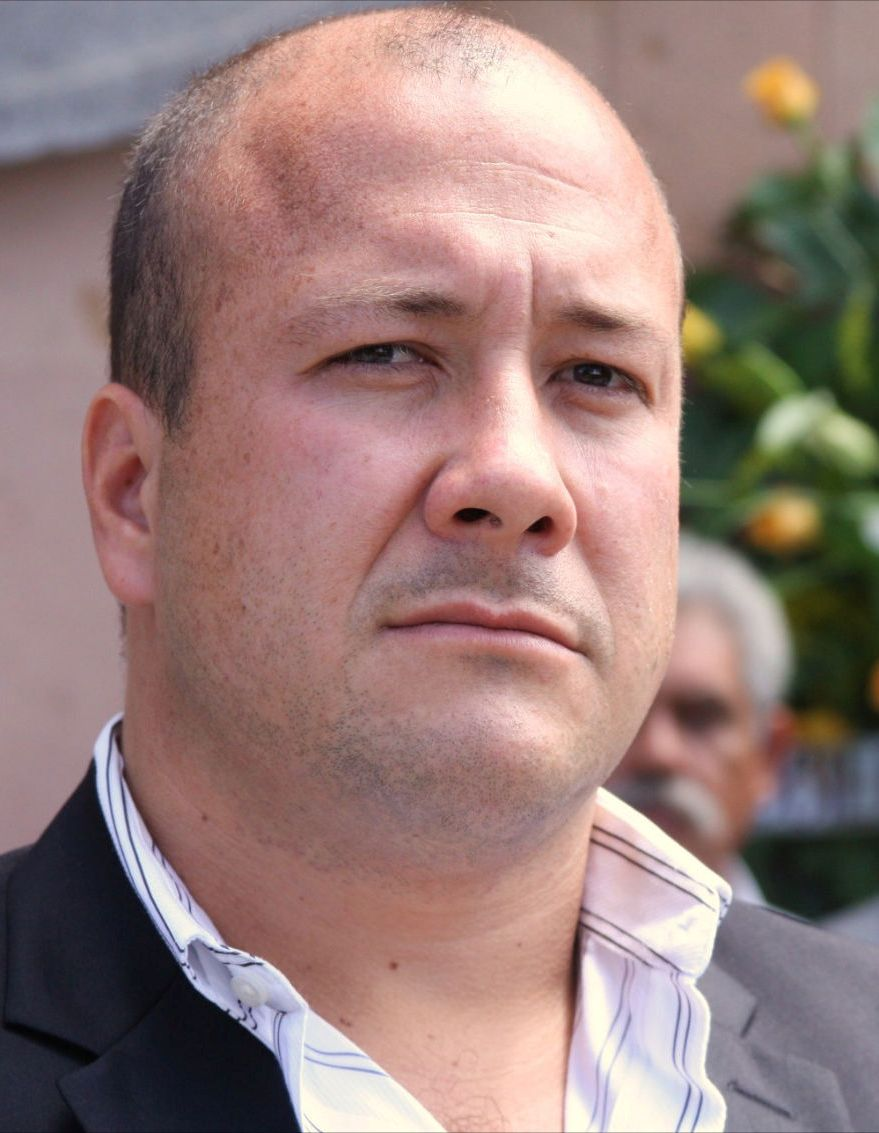

58th Governor of Jalisco
- In office December 6, 2018 – December 5, 2024
- Preceded by: Aristóteles Sandoval
- Succeeded by: Pablo Lemus Navarro

Mayor of Guadalajara
- In office October 1, 2015 – December 17, 2017
- Preceded by: Ramiro Hernández García
- Succeeded by: Enrique Ibarra Pedroza

Personal details
- Born: June 20, 1973 (age 53) Guadalajara, Jalisco, Mexico
- Party: Independent (2018 – present); Movimiento Ciudadano (until 2018)
- Spouse: Lorena Martínez (separated)
- Domestic partner: Joanna Santillan (since 2018)
- Education: Western Institute of Technology and Higher Education (BS); El Colegio de Mexico (MUP)

Enrique Alfaro Ramírez (born June 20, 1973) is a Mexican politician who was the Governor of Jalisco from 2018 to 2024. In 2009, he served as mayor of Tlajomulco de Zúñiga. He mounted his gubernatorial campaign in 2012 under the Movimiento Ciudadano (MC) party but lost to the Institutional Revolutionary Party (PRI). Alfaro Ramírez decided to run for mayor of Guadalajara that year and won the elections. After serving for three years, he ran for governor again under the MC and was victorious. This victory marked the MC's first gubernatorial win in its history. Within a week of the election results, however, he resigned from the MC and decided to be an independent governor, claiming he was never an active member of the MC.

== Early life and education ==
Alfaro Ramírez was born in Guadalajara, Jalisco, on June 20, 1973. He obtained a bachelor's degree in civil engineering from the Western Institute of Technology and Higher Education (ITESO) in 1995 and a master's degree in urban studies from El Colegio de México in 1999. He worked in various capacities in the federal government, focusing on urban development, between 1996 and 2003, and from 2003 to 2006, he was a town councilor in Tlajomulco de Zúñiga.

== Political career ==
In 2007, Alfaro Ramírez won his first election, serving as a state legislator in Jalisco. Among the highlights of his tenure in the state congress were the creation of Jalisco's Metropolitan Matters Commission (Spanish: Comisión de Asuntos Metropolitanos) as well as laws reducing public funding for political parties and allowing for the removal of the governor. He was elected mayor of Tlajomulco de Zúñiga in 2009 and served in that capacity for three years.

Alfaro Ramírez mounted his first gubernatorial campaign in 2012 as the Movimiento Ciudadano (MC) candidate. He finished in a close second place, four percentage points behind Aristóteles Sandoval of the Institutional Revolutionary Party (PRI). After losing the governor's race, Alfaro Ramírez ran for mayor of Guadalajara, again with MC, in 2015. His victory marked the first time that neither the National Action Party (PAN) or PRI had won the mayorship of Guadalajara. He served as mayor from October 1, 2015, to December 17, 2017. During his mayoral term in Guadalajara, he was questioned over a public art project and a pair of land sales. Alfaro Ramírez defended his administration by saying that his actions would lead to improvements in urbanization.

=== Gubernatorial campaign ===
In 2018, Alfaro Ramírez ran as the MC gubernatorial candidate for Governor of Jalisco. While MC was in national coalition with the PAN and Party of the Democratic Revolution (PRD), it ran alone in state races. He won the election with 37.7 percent of the vote on election night, giving MC its first ever outright gubernatorial win. Within a week of the election, he announced he was severing all ties with MC, a party of which he claims to never have been an active member, and that he would serve as an independent governor. He also declared that 2018 was his last election.

=== Governor ===
==== Health ====
Jalisco reported about 25% of the Dengue fever cases in the country in 2019 (11,727 cases and 49 deaths) and 2020 (5,362 cases and 20 deaths).

Between March 2020 and December 19, 2020, Jalisco reported 130,192 cases of infection and 5,402 deaths related to the COVID-19 pandemic in Mexico.

==== Crime ====
Alfaro Ramírez reported a reduction of 18% in crime between January 2018 and January 2019 and a 22% decrease by January 2020. However, murders increased in 2019 to 2,672, eleventh highest in the country, with 34 homicides for 100,000 people. As of August, there were 1,528 murders in 2020, an average of 7.9 per day. Two hundred sixty-six women were murdered in 2020; 54 cases were classified as femicides.

Five police officers from Casimiro Castillo were arrested for the murder of a young man on August 26, 2020. This was after four police in Ixtlahuacán de los Membrillos arrested, tortured, and killed Giovanni López, 30, for not wearing a face mask on May 4 during the pandemic. The release of a video of López′s arrest set off violent protests in Guadalajara.

The Jalisco New Generation Cartel (CJNG), one of the most dangerous drug cartels in Mexico, allegedly threatened the life of Governor Enrique Alfaro Ramírez in August and September 2020. CJNG is said to accuse the governor of breaking an agreement he had with them to control drug trafficking in the state, instead turning it over to the Sinaloa Cartel.

== Family ==
Alfaro Ramírez was married to Lorena Martínez. When he was mayor of Guadalajara, Martínez was president of the National System for Integral Family Development (DIF). She has expressed interest in running for mayor as well. Alfaro Ramírez and Martínez are separated.

== See also ==
- Cabinet of Enrique Alfaro Ramírez
