= Guadalajara Civil Hospital =

Hospital complex in Guadalajara, Mexico

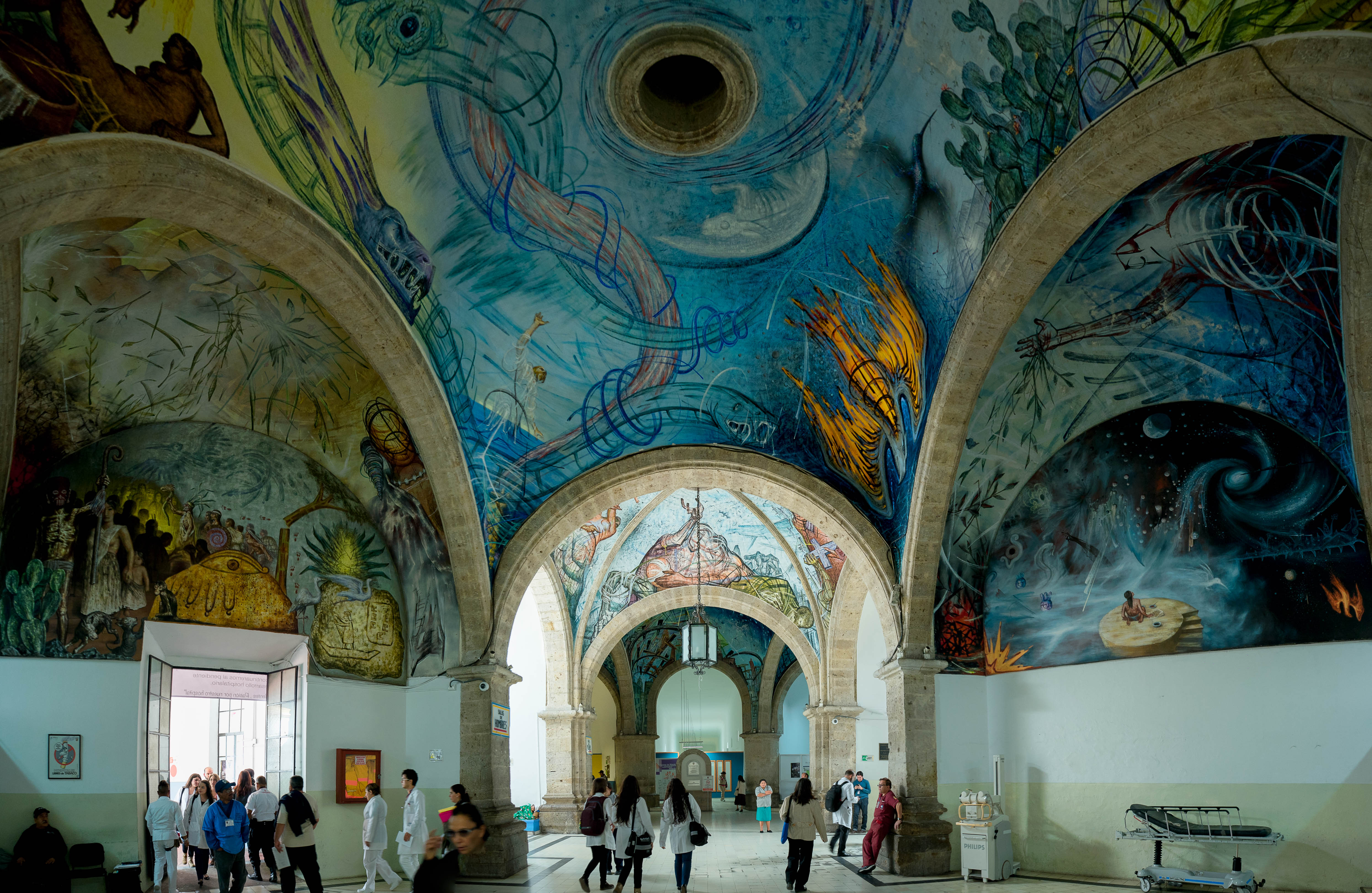
- Murals inside the Old Civil Hospital Fray Antonio Alcalde

Geography
- Location: Jalisco, Mexico
- Coordinates: 20°41′09.4″N 103°20′38.2″W

Services
- Beds: 1,057

History
- Opened: 1794

Links
- Website: portal.hcg.gob.mx/hcg/
- Lists: Hospitals in Mexico

The Guadalajara Civil Hospital (Spanish: Hospital Civil de Guadalajara or HCG) is a complex of university hospitals in Guadalajara, Jalisco, Mexico that has operated since the late 18th century. It serves as the teaching hospital for the University of Guadalajara. The complex comprises three hospitals: the Old Civil Hospital Fray Antonio Alcalde, the Dr Juan I. Menchaca Hospital, and the Eastern Civil Hospital.

== History ==
It was founded in 1794 by Guadalajara's Bishop, Fray Antonio Alcalde y Barriga, as a partner institution of the University of Guadalajara. Since its founding, the hospital has served as the university's hospital school, where students and academics from the health divisions conduct professional practices and research, respectively. The hospital's original building was the San Miguel de Belén Hospital, which was later renamed and is now known as the Old Civil Hospital Fray Antonio Alcalde. The Fray Antonio Alacalde building has murals by Gabriel Flores, Jorge Monroy, Gustavo Peralta and Martín de la Torre.

The Old Civil Hospital Fray Antonio Alcalde was declared a Jalisco cultural heritage site in 2022.
