= Governor of Jalisco =

Governor of the Mexican state of Jalisco

- Coat of arms of Jalisco

- Flag of the State of Jalisco

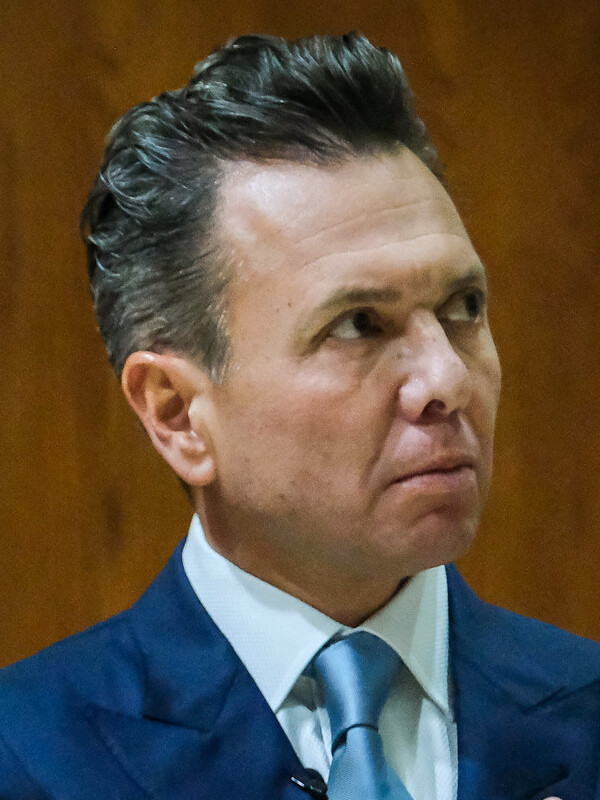
- Incumbent; Pablo Lemus Navarro since 6 December 2024
- Residence: Casa Jalisco
- Term length: Six years, non-renewable.
- Inaugural holder: Luis Quintanar
- Formation: 21 June 1823

The following is a list of governors of the Mexican state of Jalisco from 1821. The current Constitution indicates a term of six years in length, which cannot be renewed under any circumstances. It also stipulates the qualifications for becoming governor: a Mexican citizen by birth, at least 30 years of age, and a resident of Jalisco for at least five years prior to election. Elections are held concurrently with presidential elections.

== List of governors ==
=== Rulers of the Province of Nueva Galicia during Independent Mexico (1821–1823) ===
Governor	Term of office		Party	Notes
Governor	Start	End	Party	Notes
Pedro Celestino Negrete	13 June 1821	25 June 1821	??	
José Antonio de Andrade y Baldomar	26 June 1821	5 February 1822	??	
Antonio Basilio Gutiérrez y Ulloa, Victoria y Deza	6 February 1822	19 October 1822	??	Superior political chief due to temporary absence of Captain general Pedro Celestino Negrete
Luis de Quintanar	20 October 1822	21 June 1823	??	Captain general and superior political chief of the province of Nueva Galicia

=== Rulers of the State of Jalisco during Independent Mexico (1823–1836) ===
Governor	Term of office		Party	Notes|-
Governor	Start	End	Party	Notes|-
Luis de Quintanar	21 June 1823	17 June 1824	??	Constituent governor of the State of Jalisco
José Ma. Castañeda y Medina	17 June 1824	3 July 1824	??	Acting governor
Rafael Dávila	4 July 1824	23 October 1824	??	Acting vice governor
Juan Nepomuceno Cumplido	24 October 1824	23 January 1825	??	Acting vice governor
Prisciliano Sánchez Padilla	24 January 1825	29 December 1826	??	Constitutional governor of the Free State of Jalisco
José María Echauri	30 December 1826	18 January 1827	??	Acting governor
Juan Nepomuceno Cumplido	19 January 1827	23 September 1828	??	Vice governor
José Justo Corro	24 September 1828	28 February 1829	??	Acting governor
José Ignacio Cañedo y Arróniz	1 March 1829	6 February 1830	??	Constitutional governor
José Ignacio Herrera y Cairo	7 February 1830	4 March 1830	??	Vice governor
Ramón Navarro	8 March 1830	15 March 1830	??	Military imposition
Juan Nepomuceno Cumplido	15 March 1830	29 July 1830	??	
José Ignacio Cañedo y Arróniz	29 July 1830	25 October 1830	??	Constitucional governor
José Ignacio Herrera y Cairo	26 October 1830	14 February 1831	??	Vice governor
José Ignacio Cañedo y Arróniz	15 February 1831	19 August 1832	??	As a result of a conflict between the State Government and the General Command, by decree 406 of Congress, of 24 November 1831, the State Powers moved to the city of Lagos de Moreno, where they functioned since 4 December 1831, to 5 January 1832
José Ignacio Herrera y Cairo	20 August 1832	19 February 1833	??	
Pedro Tamés Jurado	1 March 1833	16 June 1834	??	Constitutional governor
Francisco Cortés Valdivia	17 June 1834	17 June 1834	??	Acting governor
Santiago Guzmán Parra	18 June 1834	22 June 1834	??	Acting governor
Juan Nepomuceno Cumplido	23 June 1834	11 August 1834	??	Vice governor
José Antonio Romero	12 August 1834	1 December 1834	??	Provisional
José Antonio Romero	2 December 1834	5 January 1836	??	Constitutional governor
Antonio Escobedo	5 January 1836	25 January 1836	??	Voter in the Departmental Governing Body
José Antonio Romero	25 January 1836	18 June 1836	??	Acting governor

=== Governors of Jalisco, Centralism and Federalism (1836–1857) ===
Governors	Term of office		Party	Notes
Governors	Start	End	Party	Notes
Antonio Escobedo	19 June 1836	??/11/1837	??	Vice governor
José Justo Corro	??/11/1837	??/12/1837	??	Acting governor
Antonio Escobedo	??/12/1837	8 August 1841	??	Department of Jalisco
Mariano Paredes	12 August 1841	9 September 1841	??	Acting governor
Joaquín Castañeda	10 September 1841	4 November 1841	??	Voter in the Departmental Governing Body
Mariano Paredes y Arrillaga	??/05/1842	??/01/1843	??	Governor and general commander
José María Jarero	5 February 1843	23 March 1843	??	Governor and general commander of the Department of Jalisco
José Antonio Mozo	??/05/1843	??/02/1844	??	Department of Jalisco
Manuel Antonio Cañedo	2 March 1844	9 March 1844	??	Department of Jalisco
Pánfilo Galindo	??/03/1844	??/05/1844	??	Department of Jalisco
Antonio Escobedo	6 May 1844	20 May 1846	??	Constitucional governor of the Department of Jalisco
Juan Nepomuceno Cumplido	20 May 1846	6 June 1846	??	Acting governor of the State of Jalisco
José María Yáñez	12 June 1846	14 August 1846	??	Acting governor of the State of Jalisco
Juan Nepomuceno Cumplido	15 August 1846	23 November 1846	??	Acting governor of the State of Jalisco
Joaquín Angulo	24 November 1846	??/09/1847	??	Acting governor
Sabás Sánchez Hidalgo	??/09/1847	??/09/1847	??	Acting governor
Joaquín Angulo	??/09/1847	29 February 1848	??	Acting governor
José Guadalupe Montenegro	1 March 1848	1 March 1848	??	
Joaquín Angulo	2 March 1848	22 March 1848	??	
José Guadalupe Montenegro	23 March 1848	1 May 1848	??	
Joaquín Angulo	2 May 1848	7 August 1848	??	
José Guadalupe Montenegro	8 August 1848	19 November 1848	??	
Joaquín Angulo	20 November 1848	12 April 1849	??	
José Guadalupe Montenegro	13 April 1849	25 April 1849	??	
Joaquín Angulo	26 April 1849	15 October 1849	??	
José Guadalupe Montenegro	16 October 1849	14 November 1849	??	
Joaquín Angulo	15 November 1849	10 March 1850	??	
José Guadalupe Montenegro	11 March 1850	9 May 1850	??	
Joaquín Angulo	10 May 1850	20 June 1850	??	
José Guadalupe Montenegro	21 June 1850	19 July 1850	??	
Joaquín Angulo	20 July 1850	26 July 1850	??	
José Guadalupe Montenegro	27 July 1850	11 October 1850	??	
Joaquín Angulo	12 October 1850	??/09/1851	??	
José Guadalupe Montenegro	??/09/1851	??/10/1851	??	
Joaquín Angulo	??/10/1851	29 February 1852	??	
Jesús López Portillo	1 March 1852	26 July 1852	??	
Gregorio Dávila	26 July 1852	13 September 1852	??	
José María Blancarte	13 September 1852	20 October 1852	??	Governor and general commander
José María Yáñez	20 October 1852	10 June 1853	??	Governor and general commander
José Palomar y Rueda	10 June 1853	16 July 1853	??	Acting governor
José María Ortega	17 July 1853	13 May 1855	??	Governor and general commander
Manuel Gamboa	14 May 1855	22 August 1855	??	Governor and general commander
Ignacio Comonfort	23 August 1855	31 August 1855	??	
Santos Degollado	1 September 1855	4 January 1856	??	Governor and general commander
Gregorio Dávila	4 January 1856	5 February 1856	Liberal	Substitute governor
Santos Degollado	6 February 1856	30 May 1856	Liberal	Governor and general commander
José Ignacio Herrera y Cairo	30 May 1856	30 July 1856	Liberal	Substitute governor
Anastasio Parrodi	31 July 1856	16 December 1856	??	Governor and general commander

=== Rulers of Jalisco during the Reform and the Second Empire, until the Restored Republic (1857–1867) ===
Governor	Term of office		Party	Notes
Governor	Start	End	Party	Notes
Gregorio Dávila	17 December 1856	8 February 1857	??	Substitute governor
Anastasio Parrodi	2 March 1857	18 January 1858	??	
Jesús Leandro Camarena	18 January 1858	17 March 1858	??	Substitute governor
José Silverio Núñez	17 March 1858	23 March 1858	Liberal	Governor and general commander
Urbano Tovar	24 March 1858	6 April 1858	Conservative	Department of Jalisco
Pedro Ogazón	7 April 1858	7 April 1858	Liberal	Substitute governor
Urbano Tovar	8 April 1858	2 June 1858	Conservative	Department of Jalisco
Francisco García Casanova	3 June 1858	23 September 1858	??	Governor and general commander of the Department of Jalisco
José María Blancarte	24 September 1858	28 October 1858	??	
Pedro Ogazón	29 October 1858	16 December 1858	Liberal	
José Quintanilla	18 December 1858	8 January 1859	??	
Leonardo Márquez	8 January 1859	20 March 1859	Conservative	
Luis Tapia	27 March 1859	14 May 1859	Conservative	
Leonardo Márquez	15 May 1859	28 May 1859	Conservative	Governor and commander in chief
Luis Tapia	29 May 1859	2 September 1859	Conservative	Governor and general commander due to temporary absence of Leonardo Márquez
Leonardo Márquez	3 September 1859	14 November 1859	Conservative	Department of Jalisco
Luis Tapia	15 November 1859	14 December 1859	Conservative	
Adrián Woll	15 December 1859	24 May 1860	Conservative	Governor and general commander
Pedro Espejo	??/05/1860	??/05/1860	Conservative	Governor and commander due the absence of Woll during the first days of May
Pedro Valadez	24 May 1860	26 May 1860	??	
Severo Castillo	??/06/1860	2 November 1860	Conservative	Governor and general in chief
Pedro Ogazón	2 November 1860	30 July 1861	Liberal	Governor and general commander
Ignacio Luis Vallarta	1 August 1861	1 September 1861	Liberal	Substitute governor
Pedro Ogazón	2 September 1861	23 December 1861	Liberal	
Ignacio Luis Vallarta	23 December 1861	11 February 1862	Liberal	
Pedro Ogazón	12 February 1862	??/10/1862	Liberal	Constitucional governor
Manuel Doblado	??/10/1862	5 December 1862	Liberal	Governor and military commander
Jesús López Portillo	6 December 1862	17 December 1862	??	Governor and military commander
Manuel Doblado	??/12/1862	??/03/1863	Liberal	
Pedro Ogazón	??/03/1863	20 June 1863	Liberal	Governor and general commander of the States of Jalisco and Colima
José María Arteaga	20 June 1863	1863	??	
Ángel Bravo	1863	1863	??	
Rómulo Díaz de la Vega	7 January 1864	7 August 1864	Monarchist	Superior political prefect. The antagonistic sides, monarchist and republican, controlled only parts of the State
Domingo Llamas	8 August 1864	11 December 1864	Monarchist	Superior political prefect
José María Arteaga	1864	1864	Liberal	
Anacleto Herrera y Cairo	24 July 1864	??/09/1864	Liberal	
José María Gutiérrez Hermosillo	??/09/1864	??/10/1864	??	
Mariano Morett	12 December 1864	7 May 1865	Monarchist	Superior political prefect
Jesús López Portillo	8 May 1865	4 October 1865	Monarchist	Superior political prefect
Mariano Morett	1865	1866	??	
Teodoro Marmolejo	1866	1866	??	
Mariano Morett	1866	1866	??	
Teodoro Marmolejo	1866	1866	??	
Juan Carlos Jontan	1866	1866	??	
Jesús López Portillo	1866	1866	??	
Francisco Gutiérrez	??/08/1866	??/12/1866	Monarchist	Imperial commissary and general commander
Eulogio Parra	21 December 1866	26 December 1866	Liberal	Military commander of the State of Jalisco
Donato Guerra	1866	1867	Liberal	
Antonio Gómez Cuervo	16 January 1867	8 December 1867	Liberal	Governor and acting military commander

=== Governors of Jalisco since the Restored Republic until 1877 (1867–1877) ===
Governor	Term of office		Party	Notes
Governor	Start	End	Party	Notes
Antonio Gómez Cuervo	8 December 1867	17 May 1868	Liberal	Constitutional governor
Emeterio Robles Gil	18 May 1868	1 March 1869	Liberal	Substitute governor
Antonio Gómez Cuervo	2 March 1869	17 January 1870	Liberal	Constitutional governor
Florentino Carrillo	17 January 1870	6 April 1870	??	Governor and military commander
Antonio Gómez Cuervo	6 April 1870	28 February 1871	Liberal	Constitutional governor
Jesús Leandro Camarena	11 June 1870	12 June 1870	Liberal	Acting governor, simultaneously with Antonio Gómez Cuervo
Aurelio Hermoso	13 June 1870	28 February 1871	Liberal	Substitute, simultaneously with Antonio Gómez Cuervo
Jesús Leandro Camarena	1 March 1871	15 July 1871	Liberal	Acting governor
Félix Barrón	15 July 1871	26 September 1871	??	Substitute governor
Ignacio Luis Vallarta	27 September 1871	28 February 1875	Liberal	Constitutional governor
Jesús Leandro Camarena	1 March 1875	9 February 1876	Liberal	Constitutional governor
José Ceballos	9 February 1876	24 November 1876	Lerdist	Governor and military commander
Leopoldo Romano	??/11/1876	??/01/1877	??	In charge of the government and the military command, due to the temporary absence of José Ceballos

=== Governors of the State of Jalisco during the Porfiriato (1877–1911) ===
Governor	Term of office		Party	Notes
Governor	Start	End	Party	Notes
Jesús Leandro Camarena	6 January 1877	28 February 1879	??	Constitutional governor
Fermín González Riestra	1 February 1879	4 February 1882	??	Constitutional governor
Antonio I. Morelos	5 February 1882	26 May 1882	??	Acting governor
Pedro Landázuri	26 May 1882	28 February 1883	??	Provisional governor
Francisco Tolentino	1 March 1883	9 September 1883	??	Constitutional governor
Maximiano Valdovinos	10 September 1883	1 October 1883	??	Substitute governor
Francisco Tolentino	2 October 1883	30 April 1884	??	Constitutional governor
Maximiano Valdovinos	1 May 1884	17 May 1884	??	Substitute governor
Francisco Tolentino	18 May 1884	22 December 1884	??	Constitutional governor
Maximiano Valdovinos	23 December 1884	5 January 1885	??	Substitute governor
Francisco Tolentino	6 January 1885	5 July 1885	??	Constitutional governor
Maximiano Valdovinos	6 July 1885	23 July 1885	??	Substitute governor
Francisco Tolentino	24 July 1885	1 February 1886	??	Constitutional governor
Maximiano Valdovinos	2 February 1886	23 February 1886	??	Substitute governor
Francisco Tolentino	24 February 1886	27 May 1886	??	Constitutional governor
Maximiano Valdovinos	28 May 1886	7 June 1886	??	Substitute governor
Francisco Tolentino	8 June 1886	20 October 1886	??	Constitutional governor
Maximiano Valdovinos	21 October 1886	3 November 1886	??	Substitute governor
Francisco Tolentino	4 November 1886	28 February 1887	??	Constitutional governor
Ramón Corona	1 March 1887	22 September 1887	Liberal	Constitutional governor.
Luis C. Curiel	23 September 1887	23 November 1887	Porfirista	Substitute governor
Ramón Corona	24 November 1887	17 March 1888	Liberal	Constitutional governor
Juan G. Robles	17 March 1888	18 March 1888	??	Acting governor
Pedro A. Galván	19 March 1888	30 March 1888	??	Substitute governor
Ramón Corona	1 April 1888	9 January 1889	Liberal	Constitutional governor
Mariano Bárcena	10 January 1889	24 January 1889	??	Substitute governor
Ramón Corona	25 January 1889	21 March 1889	Liberal	Constitutional governor
Mariano Bárcena	22 March 1889	31 March 1889	??	Substitute governor
Ramón Corona	1 April 1889	11 November 1889	Liberal	Constitutional governor. Assassinated
Ventura Anaya y Aranda	11 November 1889	12 November 1889	??	Interim governor by operation of law
Mariano Bárcena	13 November 1889	6 May 1890	??	Substitute governor
Ventura Anaya y Aranda	7 May 1890	30 May 1890	??	Interim governor by operation of law
Mariano Bárcena	31 May 1890	21 October 1890	??	Substitute governor
Luis C. Curiel	22 October 1890	28 February 1891	Porfirista	Substitute governor
Pedro A. Galván	1 March 1891	5 April 1891	??	Constitutional governor. Elected for the 1891–1895 term
Miguel Gómez	6 April 1891	22 April 1891	??	Substitute governor
Pedro A. Galván	23 April 1891	17 December 1891	??	Constitutional governor
Francisco Santa Cruz	18 December 1891	17 April 1892	??	Substitute governor
Pedro A. Galván	18 April 1892	20 November 1892	??	Constitutional governor
Francisco Santa Cruz	21 November 1892	2 March 1893	??	Substitute governor
Luis C. Curiel	2 March 1893	8 November 1893	Porfirista	Substitute governor
Francisco Santa Cruz	9 November 1893	16 November 1893	??	Substitute governor
Luis C. Curiel	17 November 1893	10 May 1894	Porfirista	Substitute governor
Gregorio Saavedra	11 May 1894	10 June 1894	??	Substitute governor
Luis C. Curiel	11 June 1894	18 August 1894	Porfirista	Substitute governor
Gregorio Saavedra	19 August 1894	27 August 1894	??	Substitute governor
Luis C. Curiel	28 August 1894	19 February 1895	Porfirista	Substitute governor
Gregorio Saavedra	20 February 1895	28 February 1895	??	Substitute governor
Luis C. Curiel	1 March 1895	17 June 1895	Porfirista	Constitutional governor. On 1 March 1895, he started a quadrennium (four-year term)
Gregorio Saavedra	18 June 1895	27 June 1895	??	Substitute governor
Luis C. Curiel	28 June 1895	19 August 1895	Porfirista	Constitutional governor
Emiliano Robles Núñez	20 August 1895	22 August 1895	??	Interim governor by operation of law
Luis C. Curiel	23 August 1895	14 March 1896	Porfirista	Constitutional governor
Juan R. Zavala	15 March 1896	30 March 1896	??	Substitute governor
Luis C. Curiel	31 March 1896	15 May 1896	Porfirista	Constitutional governor
Gregorio Saavedra	16 May 1896	2 June 1896	??	Substitute governor
Luis C. Curiel	3 June 1896	4 November 1896	Porfirista	Constitutional governor
Gregorio Saavedra	5 November 1896	13 November 1896	??	Substitute governor
Luis C. Curiel	14 November 1896	11 June 1897	Porfirista	Constitutional governor
Juan R. Zavala	12 June 1897	21 June 1897	??	Substitute governor
Luis C. Curiel	22 June 1897	1 December 1897	Porfirista	Constitutional governor
Gregorio Saavedra	2 December 1897	18 December 1897	??	Substitute governor
Luis C. Curiel	19 December 1897	30 March 1898	Porfirista	Constitutional governor
Juan R. Zavala	31 March 1898	5 April 1898	??	Substitute governor
Luis C. Curiel	6 April 1898	25 January 1899	Porfirista	Constitutional governor
Juan R. Zavala	26 January 1899	28 February 1899	??	Substitute governor
Luis C. Curiel	1 March 1899	25 May 1899	Porfirista	Constitutional governor. On 1 March 1899, he started a new quadrennium
Amado Rivas	26 May 1899	12 June 1899	??	Substitute governor
Luis C. Curiel	13 June 1899	18 August 1899	Porfirista	Constitutional governor
Juan R. Zavala	19 August 1899	30 September 1899	??	Substitute governor
Luis C. Curiel	1 October 1899	7 May 1900	Porfirista	Constitutional governor
José Luis García	8 May 1900	28 May 1900	??	Substitute governor
Luis C. Curiel	29 May 1900	29 November 1900	Porfirista	Constitutional governor
Juan R. Zavala	30 November 1900	27 December 1900	??	Substitute governor
Luis C. Curiel	28 December 1900	16 April 1901	Porfirista	Constitutional governor
Juan R. Zavala	17 April 1901	30 April 1901	??	Substitute governor
Luis C. Curiel	1 May 1901	17 October 1901	Porfirista	Constitutional governor
Juan R. Zavala	18 October 1901	2 November 1901	??	Substitute governor
Luis C. Curiel	3 November 1901	5 December 1901	Porfirista	Constitutional governor
Amado Rivas	6 December 1901	16 December 1901	??	Substitute governor
Luis C. Curiel	17 December 1901	26 February 1902	Porfirista	Constitutional governor
Juan R. Zavala	27 February 1902	18 March 1902	??	Substitute governor
Luis C. Curiel	19 March 1902	27 August 1902	Porfirista	Constitutional governor
Juan R. Zavala	28 August 1902	18 October 1902	??	Substitute governor
Luis C. Curiel	19 October 1902	9 January 1903	Porfirista	Constitutional governor
Juan R. Zavala	10 January 1903	28 February 1903	??	Substitute governor
Miguel Ahumada	1 March 1903	13 April 1903	Porfirista	Constitutional governor. On 1 March 1903, he started his first quadrennium
Juan R. Zavala	14 April 1903	28 April 1903	??	Substitute governor
Miguel Ahumada	29 April 1903	21 August 1903	Porfirista	Constitutional governor
Juan R. Zavala	22 August 1903	14 September 1903	??	Substitute governor
Miguel Ahumada	15 September 1903	8 May 1904	Porfirista	Constitutional governor
Juan R. Zavala	9 May 1904	10 June 1904	??	Substitute governor
Miguel Ahumada	11 June 1904	5 November 1904	Porfirista	Constitutional governor
Juan R. Zavala	6 November 1904	27 December 1904	??	Substitute governor
Miguel Ahumada	28 December 1904	18 August 1905	Porfirista	Constitutional governor
Juan R. Zavala	19 August 1905	17 October 1905	??	Substitute governor
Miguel Ahumada	18 October 1905	10 May 1906	Porfirista	Constitutional governor
Juan R. Zavala	11 May 1906	1 April 1906	??	Substitute governor
Miguel Ahumada	2 April 1906	20 June 1906	Porfirista	Constitutional governor
Juan R. Zavala	21 June 1906	9 July 1906	??	Substitute governor
Miguel Ahumada	10 July 1906	5 February 1907	Porfirista	Constitutional governor
Juan R. Zavala	6 February 1907	28 February 1907	??	Substitute governor
Miguel Ahumada	1 March 1907	2 August 1908	Porfirista	Constitutional governor. On 1 March 1907, he started his second quadrennium
Juan R. Zavala	3 August 1908	14 September 1908	??	Substitute governor
Miguel Ahumada	15 September 1908	1 May 1909	Porfirista	Constitutional governor
Rafael López	2 May 1909	10 May 1909	??	Interim governor by operation of law
Miguel Ahumada	11 May 1909	2 January 1910	Porfirista	Constitutional governor
Juan R. Zavala	3 January 1910	15 January 1910	??	Substitute governor
Miguel Ahumada	16 January 1910	3 August 1910	Porfirista	Constitutional governor
Juan R. Zavala	4 August 1910	30 August 1910	??	Substitute governor
Miguel Ahumada	31 August 1910	25 January 1911	Porfirista	Constitutional governor
Juan R. Zavala	25 January 1911	28 February 1911	??	Substitute governor
Manuel Cuesta Gallardo	1 March 1911	19 April 1911	Porfirista	Constitutional governor
Emiliano Robles	20 April 1911	22 April 1911	??	Acting governor
Manuel Cuesta Gallardo	23 April 1911	24 May 1911	Porfirista	Constitutional governor

=== Governors of the State of Jalisco during the Mexican Revolution (1911–1920) ===
Governor	Term of office		Party	Note	
Governor	Start	End	Party	Note	
David Gutiérrez Allende	24 May 1911	31 July 1911	??		
Alberto Robles Gil	1 August 1911	22 October 1912	??		
José López Portillo y Rojas	23 October 1912	10 February 1914	Huertista		
José M. Mier	10 February 1914	7 July 1914	??		
Manuel M. Diéguez	8 July 1914	22 September 1914	Obregonista		
Manuel Aguirre Berlanga	23 September 1914	5 November 1914	??	Substitute governor	
Manuel M. Diéguez	6 November 1914	16 December 1914	Obregonista		
Julián Medina	17 December 1914	18 January 1915	Villista		
Manuel M. Diéguez	18 January 1915	12 February 1915	Obregonista		
Julián Medina	13 February 1915	17 April 1915	Villista		
Manuel Aguirre Berlanga	18 April 1915	23 April 1915	??	Substitute governor	
Manuel M. Diéguez	24 April 1915	8 June 1916	Obregonista		
Tomás López Linares	9 June 1916	23 June 1916	??	Acting governor	
Manuel M. Diéguez	24 June 1916	17 September 1916	Obregonista		
Tomás López Linares	18 September 1916	18 September 1916	??	Acting governor	
Manuel M. Diéguez	19 September 1916	16 November 1916	Obregonista		
Tomás López Linares	17 November 1916	17 November 1916	??	Acting governor	
Manuel M. Diéguez	18 November 1916	21 December 1916	Obregonista		
Tomás López Linares	22 December 1916	22 December 1916	??	Acting governor	
Manuel M. Diéguez	23 December 1916	17 July 1917	Obregonista		
Emiliano Degollado	18 July 1917	18 July 1917	??	Acting governor	
Manuel M. Diéguez	19 July 1917	19 September 1917	Obregonista		
Emiliano Degollado	20 September 1917	24 February 1918	??	Acting governor	
Manuel Bouquet Jr.	24 February 1918	28 February 1919	??	Acting governor	
Luis Castellanos y Tapia	1 March 1919	10 November 1919	??		
Francisco H. Ruiz	11 November 1919	11 November 1919	??	Acting governor	
Luis Castellanos y Tapia	12 November 1919	31 January 1920	??		
Francisco H. Ruiz	1 February 1920	1 February 1920	??	Acting governor	
Luis Castellanos y Tapia	2 February 1920	15 February 1920	??		
Francisco H. Ruiz	16 February 1920	16 February 1920	??	Acting governor	
Luis Castellanos y Tapia	17 February 1920	12 May 1920	¿?		??

=== Governors of the Free and Sovereign State of Jalisco (1920 until the present) ===
Governor	Term of office		Party	Notes
Governor	Start	End	Party	Notes
Ignacio Ramos Praslow	17 May 1920	19 July 1920	??	
Francisco Labastida Izquierdo	19 July 1920	28 February 1921	??	
Basilio Vadillo	1 March 1921	17 March 1922	Partido Liberal Constitucionalista (México)	
Antonio Valadez Ramírez	18 March 1922	28 February 1923	??	
José Barba Anaya	1922		??	Replaced Valadez during brief leave
José Guadalupe Zuno	1 March 1923	8 December 1923	??	
Francisco Tolentino	8 December 1923	14 January 1924	??	Substitute governor
Aurelio Sepúlveda	15 January 1924	10 February 1924	??	Provisional governor
José Guadalupe Zuno	11 February 1924	23 March 1926	??	Resumed
Clemente Sepúlveda	24 March 1926	28 July 1926	??	
Silvano Barba González	29 July 1926	28 February 1927	??	
Luis R. Castillo	1926		??	Replaced Barba during brief leave
Esteban Loera	1926		??	Replaced Barba during brief leave
Enrique Cuervo	1927		??	Replaced Barba during brief leave
Daniel R. Benítez	1 March 1927	22 April 1927	??	
Margarito Ramírez	23 April 1927	7 August 1929	Obregonista	
José Manuel Chávez	1927	1928		Replaced Ramírez during brief leave
Juan C. García	1928	1929	PNR	Replaced Ramírez during brief leave
José María Cuéllar	8 August 1929	11 July 1930	PNR	
Ruperto García de Alba	12 July 1930	28 February 1931	PNR	Acting governor
Ignacio de la Mora	1 March 1931	11 September 1931	PNR	
Juan de Dios Robledo	12 September 1931	14 October 1931	PNR	Was dismissed by the Congress of the State of Jalisco
José María Ceballos	14 October 1931	16 October 1931	PNR	
Juan de Dios Robledo	17 October 1931	31 March 1932	PNR	Resumed. Was reinstated by the Senate
Sebastián Allende Rojas	1 April 1932	28 February 1935	PNR	
Carlos Guzmán y Guzmán	1932	1933	PNR	
Ignacio Jacobo	1934		PNR	
Everardo Topete	1 March 1935	28 February 1939	PNR	
Ignacio Jacobo			PRM	Acting governor. Replaced Topete during brief leave
Juan Aviña López			PRM	Acting governor. Replaced Topete during brief leave
Clemente Sepúlveda			PRM	Acting governor. Replaced Topete during brief leave
Miguel Guevara Jiménez			PRM	Acting governor. Replaced Topete during brief leave
Víctores Pérez			PRM	Acting governor. Replaced Topete during brief leave
Alberto Fernández			PRM	Acting governor. Replaced Topete during brief leave
Luis Álvarez del Castillo			PRM	Acting governor. Replaced Topete during brief leave
Silvano Barba González	1 March 1939	28 February 1943	PRM	
Víctor Prieto			PRM	Replaced Barba during brief leave
Alberto Fernández			PRM	Replaced Barba during brief leave
Marcelino García Barragán	1 March 1943	17 February 1947	PRM	
Saturnino Coronado Organista	17 February 1947	28 February 1947	PRI	Substitute governor. End of four-year terms (quadrenniums)
José de Jesús González Gallo	1 March 1947	5 November 1949	PRI	First six-year term
Carlos Guzmán	6 November 1949	21 November 1949	PRI	Acting governor
José de Jesús González Gallo	22 November 1949	28 February 1953	PRI	Resumed
Agustín Yáñez	1 March 1953	28 February 1959	PRI	
Juan Gil Preciado	1 March 1959	30 November 1964	PRI	
José de Jesús Muñoz Limón	1 December 1964	28 February 1965	PRI	Acting governor
Francisco Medina Ascencio	1 March 1965	28 February 1971	PRI	
Alberto Orozco Romero	1 March 1971	28 February 1977	PRI	
Flavio Romero de Velasco	1 March 1977	28 February 1983	PRI	
Enrique Álvarez del Castillo	1 March 1983	30 November 1988	PRI	
Francisco Rodríguez Gómez	1 December 1988	28 February 1989	PRI	Acting governor
Guillermo Cosío Vidaurri	1 March 1989	30 April 1992	PRI	Resigned due to the 1992 Guadalajara explosions
Carlos Rivera Aceves	1 May 1992	28 February 1995	PRI	Acting governor
Alberto Cárdenas Jiménez	1 March 1995	28 February 2001	PAN	
Francisco Javier Ramírez Acuña	1 March 2001	21 November 2006	PAN	
Gerardo Octavio Solís Gómez	21 November 2006	28 February 2007	Unaffiliated	Acting governor
Emilio González Márquez	1 March 2007	28 February 2013	PAN	
Aristóteles Sandoval	1 March 2013	5 December 2018	PRI	By Decree Number 22228, of 30 May 2008, the Jalisco State Congress shortened the gubernatorial term for his administration only, from six years to five years, nine months, and five days, in such a way that, according to Transitory Article Six, subsection (c), the governor "will take office on 1 March 2013 and will conclude his mandate on 5 December 2018." Sandoval was assassinated in Puerto Vallarta on 18 December 2020.
Enrique Alfaro Ramírez	6 December 2018	5 December 2024	MC	
Pablo Lemus Navarro	6 December 2024		MC	

== See also ==
- List of Mexican state governors
