= Divided government =

Type of government in presidential systems

A divided government is a type of government in presidential systems, when control of the executive branch and the legislative branch is split between two political parties or coalitions, in semi-presidential systems, when the executive branch itself is split between two parties or coalitions, and in semi-parliamentary systems, when the legislative branch itself is split between two parties or coalitions. In strict parliamentary systems, if the executive does not satisfy or comply with the demands of parliament, parliament can force the executive to resign via a motion of no confidence.

== Presidential systems ==
Under the separation of powers model, the state is divided into different branches. Each branch has separate and independent powers and areas of responsibility so that the powers of one branch are not in conflict with the powers associated with the others. The typical division creates an executive branch that executes and enforces the law as led by a head of government (in presidential systems, the head of government is typically the head of state, who is titled president); a legislative branch that enacts, amends, or repeals laws as led by a unicameral or bicameral legislature; and a judiciary branch that interprets and applies the law as led by a supreme or constitutional court.

Divided governments are seen by different groups as a benefit or as an undesirable product of said separations. Those in favor of divided government believe that the separations encourage more policing of those in power by the opposition, as well as limiting spending and the expansion of undesirable laws. Opponents argue that divided governments become lethargic, leading to many gridlocks. In the late 1980s, Terry M. Moe, a professor of political science at Stanford University, examined the issue. He concluded that divided governments lead to compromise which can be seen as beneficial. He also noticed that divided governments subvert performance and politicize the decisions of executive agencies. Further research has shown that during divided governments, legislatures will pass laws with sunset provisions in order to achieve a political consensus.

In the United States, divided government was rare in during the early 20th century, but has become more common since the 1970s. Divided governments are contrasted by government trifectas—a different situation in which the one party controls the executive and both chambers of a bicameral legislature. Due to the ubiquity of bicameralism in the United States, trifectas can happen at the federal level and in 49 out of the 50 U.S. states.

== Semi-presidential systems ==
In semi-presidential systems, such as France, the executive powers is divided between a chief executive (who is typically also the head of state) who is independently elected by the population and a cabinet of government ministers which is dependent on legislative confidence. A situation of divided government under semi-presidentialism is known as cohabitation, based on French practice. In cohabitation, executive power is divided between a president of one party and a cabinet of government ministers of another. Cohabitation occurs because of the duality of the executive: an independently elected chief executive and a head of government who must be acceptable both to this chief executive and to the legislature.

== Semi-parliamentary systems ==
In semi-parliamentary systems, such as Australia and Japan, the legislature is a bicameral body made up of two directly-elected houses; while both houses have influence over the lawmaking process, the executive is dependent on the confidence of the lower house only. A situation of divided government under semi-parliamentarism is called nejire Kokkai (ねじれ国会, "twisted" or "skewed" parliament) in Japanese practice, but has no special name in Australia. A skewed parliament occurs because of the duality of the legislature: since laws must be approved by both the upper and the lower houses, while the government only needs the lower house's confidence, the opposition is able to frustrate the government's legislative agenda though its majority in the upper house, while being unable to depose the government through a motion of no-confidence (as the government has a majority in the lower house).

== See also ==
- Government trifecta
- Skirt and Blouse voting
- Divided government in the United States
- Fusion of Powers
- Parliamentary system
- Peruvian political crisis (2016–present), a series of political crises triggered by a divided government
