= Palacio de Gobierno de Jalisco =

Government building in Guadalajara, Jalisco, Mexico

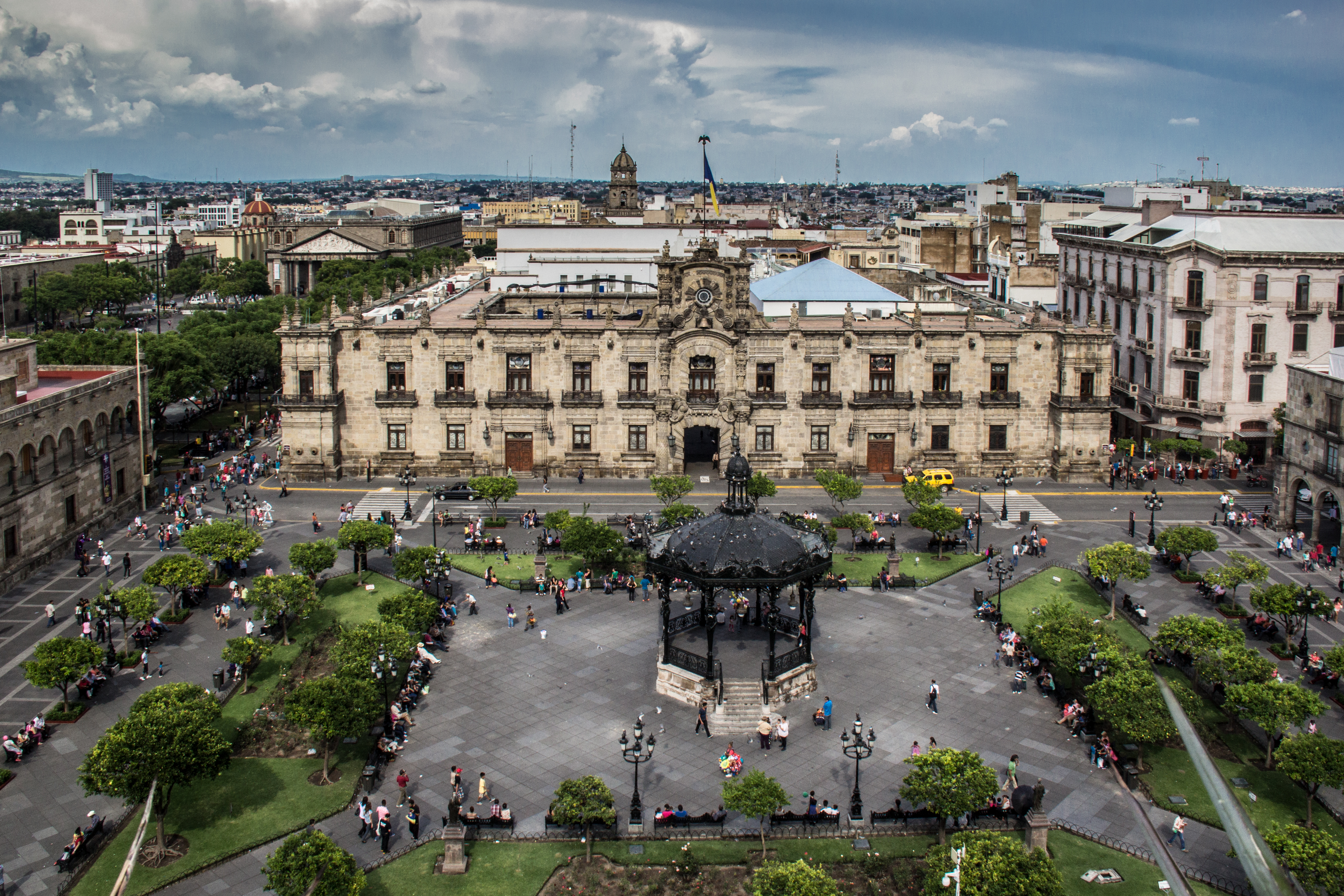
- The building next to Plaza de Armas, 2014

- Location within Mexico

General information
- Location: Guadalajara, Jalisco, Mexico
- Coordinates: 20.6762°N 103.3464°W

The Palacio de Gobierno de Jalisco, or simply Palacio de Gobierno (English: Government Palace), is an historic government building in Centro, Guadalajara, in the Mexican state of Jalisco.
