= 8th federal electoral district of Jalisco =

Federal electoral district of Mexico

Jalisco's 8th
- Electoral district of the Chamber of Deputies of Mexico

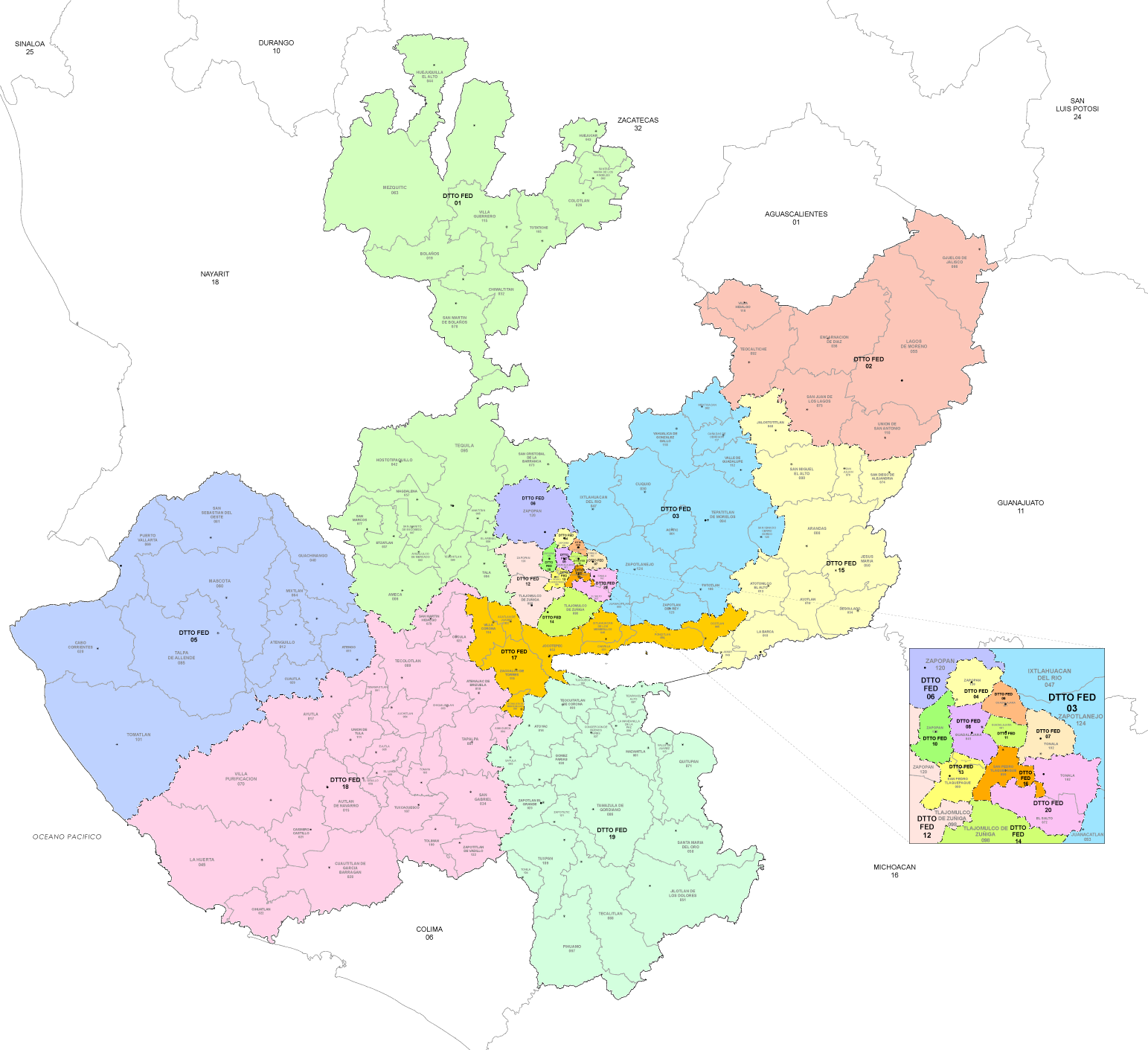
- 8th district

Incumbent
- Member: Paola Espinosa Sánchez
- Party: ▌National Action Party
- Congress: 66th (2024–2027)

District
- State: Jalisco
- Head town: Guadalajara
- Coordinates: 20°40′N 103°21′W
- Covers: Municipality of Guadalajara (part)
- PR region: First
- Precincts: 371
- Population: 417,878 (2020 census)

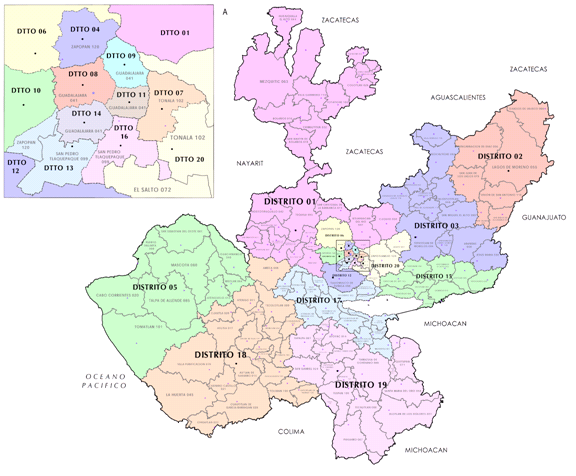
Jalisco's districts in 2017–2022

The 8th federal electoral district of Jalisco (Spanish: Distrito electoral federal 08 de Jalisco) is one of the 300 electoral districts into which Mexico is divided for elections to the federal Chamber of Deputies and one of 20 such districts in the state of Jalisco.

It elects one deputy to the lower house of Congress for each three-year legislative session by means of the first-past-the-post system. Votes cast in the district also count towards the calculation of proportional representation ("plurinominal") deputies elected from the first region.

The current member for the district, elected in the 2024 general election, is Paola Milagros Espinosa Sánchez of the National Action Party (PAN).

== District territory ==
Under the 2023 districting plan adopted by the National Electoral Institute (INE), which is to be used for the 2024, 2027 and 2030 federal elections, Jalisco's 8th district covers 371 electoral precincts (secciones electorales) in the western portion of the municipality of Guadalajara. (Note: The 9th, 11th and 13th districts cover the remainder of the municipality.)

The head town (cabecera distrital), where results from individual polling stations are gathered together and tallied, is the state capital, the city of Guadalajara. The district reported a population of 417,878 in the 2020 census.

== Previous districting schemes ==
Evolution of electoral district numbers
	1974	1978	1996	2005	2017	2023
Jalisco	13	20	19	19	20	20
Chamber of Deputies	196	300				

2017–2022

Jalisco regained its 20th congressional seat in the 2017 redistricting process. The 8th district's head town was at Guadalajara and it covered 333 precincts in the north-west of the municipality.

2005–2017

Under the 2005 plan, Jalisco had 19 districts. This district's head town was at Guadalajara and it covered 251 precincts in the centre and east of the municipality.

1996–2005

In the 1996 scheme, under which Jalisco lost a single-member seat, the district had its head town at Guadalajara and it comprised 166 precincts in the north-west of the municipality.

1978–1996

The districting scheme in force from 1978 to 1996 was the result of the 1977 electoral reforms, which increased the number of single-member seats in the Chamber of Deputies from 196 to 300. Under that plan, Jalisco's seat allocation rose from 13 to 20. The 8th district's head town was at La Barca and it covered eight municipalities in the east of the state:
- Atotonilco el Alto, Ayo el Chico, Jamay, Ocotlán, Poncitlán, Tototlán, Zapotlán del Rey and La Barca.

== Deputies returned to Congress ==
(Mexico) National parties
- Current
- PAN
- PRI
- PT
- PVEM
- MC
- Morena
- PAZ
- Somos
- Defunct or local only
- PLM
- PNR
- PRM
- PNM
- PP
- PPS
- PARM
- PFCRN
- CON
- PANAL
- PSD
- PES
- PES
- PRD

Jalisco's 8th district
Election	Deputy	Party	Term	Legislature
1916	Ramón Castañeda y Castañeda		1916–1917	Constituent Congress of Querétaro
...
1976	Ricardo Pedro Chávez Pérez	Institutional Revolutionary Party	1976–1979	50th Congress
1979	Reyes Rodolfo Flores Zaragoza	Institutional Revolutionary Party	1979–1982	51st Congress
1982	Sergio M. Beas Pérez	Institutional Revolutionary Party	1982–1985	52nd Congress
1985	Reyes Rodolfo Flores Zaragoza	Institutional Revolutionary Party	1985–1988	53rd Congress
1988	Margarita Gómez Juárez	Institutional Revolutionary Party	1988–1991	54th Congress
1991	Eliazar Ayala Rodríguez	Institutional Revolutionary Party	1991–1994	55th Congress
1994	Sofía Valencia Abundis	Institutional Revolutionary Party	1994–1997	56th Congress
1997	Mario Guillermo Haro Rodríguez	National Action Party (Mexico)	1997–2000	57th Congress
2000	José Abraham Cisneros Gómez	National Action Party (Mexico)	2000–2003	58th Congress
2003	Marisol Urrea Camarena	National Action Party (Mexico)	2003–2006	59th Congress
2006	Miguel Ángel Monraz Ibarra	National Action Party (Mexico)	2006–2009	60th Congress
2009	José Trinidad Padilla López	Institutional Revolutionary Party	2009–2012	61st Congress
2012	Leobardo Alcalá Padilla	Institutional Revolutionary Party	2012–2015	62nd Congress
2015	Verónica Delgadillo García (Note: Delgadillo García resigned her seat on 1 March 2018 and was replaced her alternate, Bermúdez Torres.); Verónica Bermúdez Torres	Citizens' Movement (Mexico)	2015–2018; 2018	63rd Congress
2018	Abril Alcalá Padilla	Party of the Democratic Revolution	2018–2021	64th Congress
2021	José Mauro Garza Marín	Citizens' Movement (Mexico)	2021–2024	65th Congress
2024	Paola Milagros Espinosa Sánchez	National Action Party (Mexico)	2024–2027	66th Congress

== Presidential elections ==
Jalisco's 8th district
Election	District won by	Party or coalition	%
2018	Ricardo Anaya Cortés	Por México al Frente	41.6270
2024	Bertha Xóchitl Gálvez Ruiz	Fuerza y Corazón por México	53.5197
