= Región Ciénega, Jalisco =

Ciénega Region
- Region
- #4-Ciénega Region
- Country: Mexico
- State: Jalisco
- Largest city: Ocotlán

Area
  - Total: 3,177 km^{2} (1,227 sq mi)

Population (2020)
  - Total: 422,219
- Time zone: UTC−6 (Central)

The Ciénega region is one of the regions of the Mexican state of Jalisco. It includes nine municipalities with a population of 422,219 inhabitants as of 2020.

== Municipalities ==
Municipality code	Name	Population		Land area			Population density	
Municipality code	Name	2020	Rank	km^{2}	sq mi	Rank	2020	Rank
013	Atotonilco el Alto	64,009	3	551	213	1	116/km^{2} (301/sq mi)	5
016	Ayotlán	41,552	5	395	153	5	105/km^{2} (272/sq mi)	6
033	Degollado	21,266	8	432	167	2	49/km^{2} (127/sq mi)	8
047	Jamay	24,894	6	151	58	9	165/km^{2} (427/sq mi)	3
018	La Barca	67,937	2	423	163	3	161/km^{2} (416/sq mi)	4
063	Ocotlán	106,050	1	248	96	7	428/km^{2} (1,108/sq mi)	1
066	Poncitlán	53,659	4	226	87	8	237/km^{2} (615/sq mi)	2
105	Tototlán	23,573	7	329	127	6	72/km^{2} (186/sq mi)	7
123	Zapotlán del Rey	19,279	9	422	163	4	46/km^{2} (118/sq mi)	9
	Ciénega Region	422,219	—	3,177	1,226.65	—	133/km^{2} (344/sq mi)	—
Source: INEGI

=== Largest cities ===
Largest cities or towns in Ciénega Region Source:
Rank		Municipality	Pop.
1	Ocotlán	Ocotlán	95,978
2	La Barca	La Barca	38,780
3	Atotonilco el Alto	Atotonilco el Alto	28,678
4	Jamay	Jamay	18,607
5	Poncitlán	Poncitlán	14,636
6	Ayotlán	Ayotlán	13,810
7	Degollado	Degollado	11,612
8	La Ribera	Ayotlán	8,908
9	San Pedro Itzicán	Poncitlán	6,686
10	Vistas del Maguey	Atotonilco el Alto	6,073
