= List of sister cities in California =

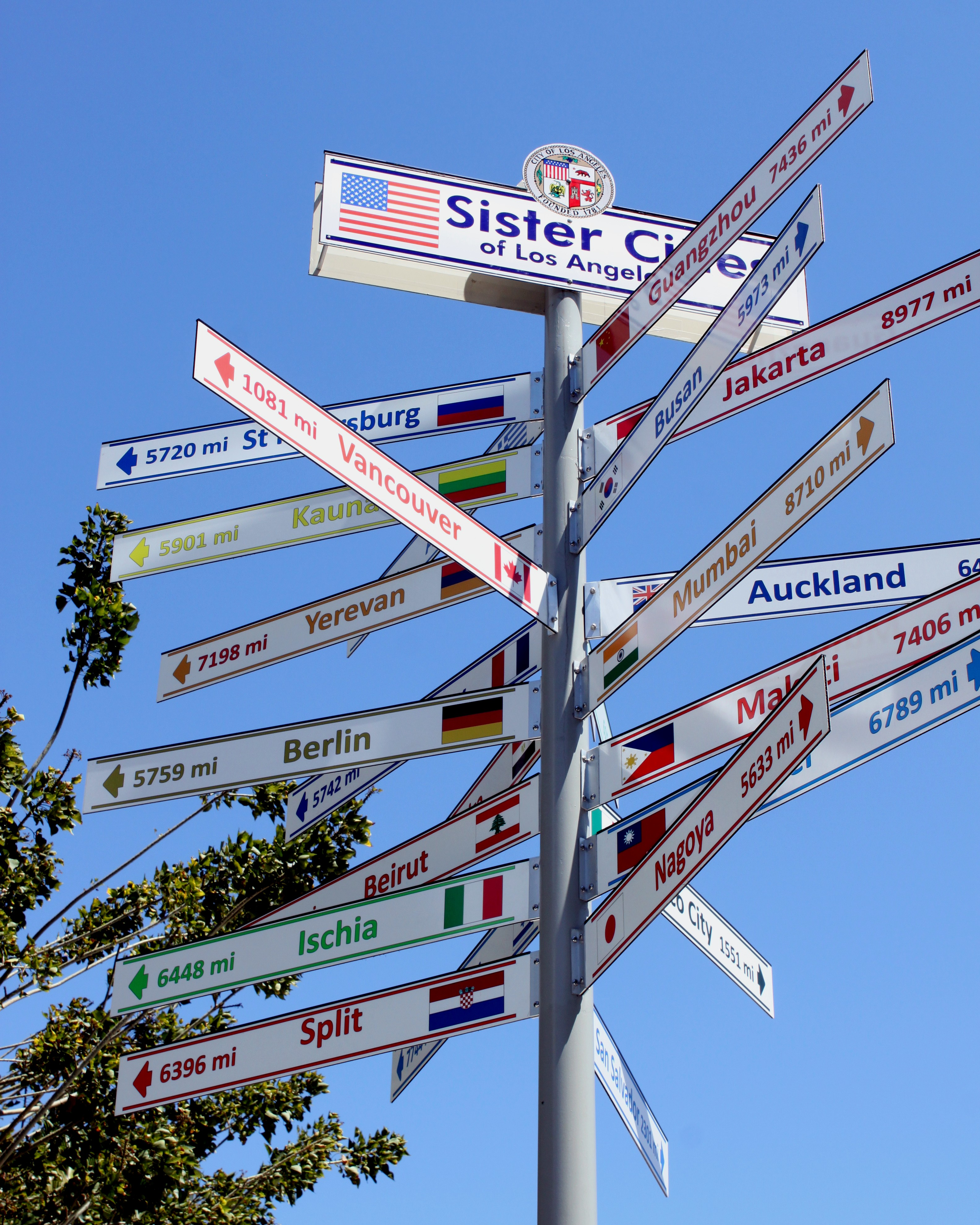
Sister cities of Los Angeles

This is a list of sister cities in the United States state of California. Sister cities, known in Europe as twin towns, are cities which partner with each other to promote human contact and cultural links. This partnering is not limited to cities and often includes counties, regions, states and other sub-national entities.

Many Californian jurisdictions work with foreign cities through Sister Cities International, an organization whose goal is to "promote peace through mutual respect, understanding, and cooperation."

== A ==
Alameda

- Dumaguete, Philippines
- Jiangyin, China
- Varazze, Italy
- Yeongdong, South Korea

Alameda County

- Taoyuan, Taiwan

Alhambra

- Rizhao, China
- Sanya, China

Anaheim

- Mito, Japan
- Vitoria-Gasteiz, Spain

Antioch

- Chichibu, Japan

Arcadia

- Taizhou, China
- Tripoli, Greece

Arcata

- Camoapa, Nicaragua

Azusa

- Zacatecas, Mexico

== B ==
Bakersfield

- Amritsar, India
- Bucheon, South Korea
- Cixi, China
- Partyzanski (Minsk), Belarus
- Querétaro, Mexico
- Wakayama, Japan

Baldwin Park

- Taxco de Alarcón, Mexico
- Tototlán, Mexico

Bellflower

- Ahome, Mexico

Benicia

- Tula de Allende, Mexico

Berkeley

- Browning, United States
- Gao, Mali
- Gongju, South Korea
- Haidian (Beijing), China
- Jena, Germany
- Las Vegas, Honduras
- León, Nicaragua
- Mathopestad (Rustenburg), South Africa
- Oukasie (Madibeng), South Africa
- Palma Soriano, Cuba
- Sakai, Japan
- San Antonio Los Ranchos, El Salvador
- Uma Bawang (Padawan), Malaysia
- Yondó, Colombia

Beverly Hills

- Acapulco, Mexico
- Cannes, France
- Herzliya, Israel
- Pudong (Shanghai), China

Big Bear Lake

- Abtenau, Austria

Brea

- Anseong, South Korea
- Hannō, Japan
- Lagos de Moreno, Mexico

Buena Park

- Seongbuk (Seoul), South Korea

Burbank

- Arezzo, Italy
- Gaborone, Botswana
- Incheon, South Korea
- Ōta, Japan
- Solna, Sweden

== C ==
Calabasas

- Anqing, China
- Mevaseret Zion, Israel

Calexico

- Mexicali, Mexico

Carlsbad

- Futtsu, Japan
- Karlovy Vary, Czech Republic

Carson

- La Carlota, Philippines
- Sōka, Japan
- Wanju, South Korea

Cathedral City

- Tequila, Mexico

Cerritos

- Loreto, Mexico

Chula Vista

- Cebu City, Philippines
- Irapuato, Mexico
- Odawara, Japan

Coloma

- Clunes (Hepburn), Australia

Compton

- Apia, Samoa
- Onitsha, Nigeria

Concord

- Kitakami, Japan

Contra Costa County

- Taichung, Taiwan

Corona

- Ocotlán, Mexico

Costa Mesa

- Wyndham, Australia

Covina

- Xalapa, Mexico

Crescent City

- Rikuzentakata, Japan

Culver City

- Capo d'Orlando, Italy
- Iksan, South Korea
- Kaizuka, Japan
- Lethbridge, Canada
- Uruapan, Mexico

Cupertino

- Copertino, Italy
- Bhubaneswar, India
- Hsinchu, Taiwan
- Toyokawa, Japan

== D ==
Daly City

- Izumisano, Japan
- Quezon City, Philippines

Davis

- Huishan (Wuxi), China
- Inuyama, Japan
- Los Baños, Philippines
- Muñoz, Philippines
- Qufu, China
- Rutilio Grande, El Salvador
- Sangju, South Korea
- Uman, Ukraine

Delano

- Arida, Japan
- Asti, Italy
- Jacona, Mexico
- Kalibo, Philippines
- Tangancícuaro, Mexico

Diamond Bar

- Sanxia (New Taipei), Taiwan

Dinuba

- Malsch, Germany

Downey

- Alajuela, Costa Rica
- Efrat, Israel
- Fresnillo, Mexico
- Guadalajara, Mexico
- San Quintín, Mexico
- (Republic of Ireland) Taghmaconnell, Ireland

Dublin

- (Republic of Ireland) Bray, Ireland

== E ==
El Cajon

- Comondu, Mexico
- Sulzfeld, Germany

El Dorado County

- Warabi, Japan

El Monte

- Zamora, Mexico

Elk Grove

- Concepción de Ataco, El Salvador

Encinitas

- Amakusa, Japan

Escondido

- Itoshima, Japan

Eureka

- Kamisu, Japan
- Nelson, New Zealand

== F ==
Fairfield

- Nirasaki, Japan

Folsom

- Jiaohe, China
- Pieve del Grappa, Italy

Fort Bragg

- Ōtsuchi, Japan

Foster City

- Inagi, Japan

Fremont

- Fukaya, Japan
- Horta, Portugal
- Jaipur, India
- Lipa, Philippines
- Puerto Peñasco, Mexico

Fresno

- Châteauroux, France
- Kōchi, Japan
- Münster, Germany
- Taishan, China
- Vagharshapat, Armenia

Fullerton

- Fukui, Japan
- Morelia, Mexico
- Yongin, South Korea

== G ==
Garden Grove

- Anyang, South Korea

Gardena

- Huatabampo, Mexico
- Ichikawa, Japan

Gilroy

- Angra do Heroísmo, Portugal
- Koror, Palau
- Monticelli d'Ongina, Italy
- Saint-Clar, France
- Takko, Japan
- Tecate, Mexico

Glendale

- Boeun, South Korea
- Gimpo, South Korea
- Goseong, South Korea
- Gyumri, Armenia
- Higashiōsaka, Japan
- Kapan, Armenia
- Rosarito Beach, Mexico
- Santiago, Dominican Republic
- Tlaquepaque, Mexico

Glendora

- Mooka, Japan

Grass Valley

- Bodmin, England, United Kingdom
- Limana, Italy

Greenfield

- Acámbaro, Mexico

Grover Beach

- Narvacan, Philippines

Gustine

- Angra do Heroísmo, Portugal

== H ==
Half Moon Bay

- Kariwa, Japan

Hanford

- Setana, Japan

Hayward

- Faro, Portugal
- Funabashi, Japan
- Ghazni, Afghanistan
- San Felipe, Mexico
- Yixing, China

Hemet

- Kushimoto, Japan
- Marumori, Japan

Hercules

- Tsushima, Japan

Hermosa Beach

- Loreto, Mexico

Highland

- Lachin, Azerbaijan

Hollister

- Katō, Japan

Huntington Beach

- Anjō, Japan
- Northern Beaches, Australia

Huntington Park

- Puebla, Mexico
- Rosarito Beach, Mexico
- San Julián, Mexico
- Yahualica de González Gallo, Mexico

== I ==
Imperial Beach

- White Rock, Canada

Irvine

- Hermosillo, Mexico
- Seocho (Seoul), South Korea
- Taoyuan, Taiwan
- Tsukuba, Japan

Irwindale

- Salvatierra, Mexico

== K ==
Kerman

- Kannami, Japan

== L ==
La Cañada Flintridge

- Villanueva de la Cañada, Spain

La Mirada

- Isehara, Japan

Laguna Beach

- Los Cabos, Mexico
- Menton, France
- St Ives, England, United Kingdom

Laguna Niguel

- Al-Qa'im, Iraq

Lathrop

- Bacarra, Philippines

Lindsay

- Ono, Japan

Livermore

- Quetzaltenango, Guatemala
- Snezhinsk, Russia
- Yotsukaidō, Japan

Livingston

- Jalostotitlán, Mexico
- Yingtan, China

Lodi

- Kōfu, Japan
- Lodi, Italy

Loma Linda

- Libertador San Martín, Argentina
- Manipal, India

Lomita

- Takaishi, Japan

Lompoc

- Cheyenne, United States
- Inca, Spain
- Lake Placid, United States
- Locarno, Switzerland
- Namwon, South Korea

Long Beach

- Mombasa, Kenya
- Phnom Penh, Cambodia
- Qingdao, China
- Sochi, Russia
- Taoyuan, Taiwan
- Yokkaichi, Japan

Los Altos

- Greater Bendigo, Australia
- Rustington, England, United Kingdom
- Shilin (Taipei), Taiwan
- Syktyvkar, Russia

Los Angeles

- Athens, Greece
- Auckland, New Zealand
- Beirut, Lebanon
- Berlin, Germany
- Bordeaux, France
- Busan, South Korea
- Eilat, Israel
- Giza, Egypt
- Guangzhou, China
- Ischia, Italy
- Jakarta, Indonesia
- Kaunas, Lithuania
- Lusaka, Zambia
- Makati, Philippines
- Mexico City, Mexico
- Mumbai, India
- Nagoya, Japan
- Saint Petersburg, Russia
- Salvador, Brazil
- San Salvador, El Salvador
- Split, Croatia
- Taipei, Taiwan
- Vancouver, Canada
- Yerevan, Armenia

Los Angeles County

- New Taipei, Taiwan

Los Gatos

- (Republic of Ireland) Listowel, Ireland
- Zihuatanejo de Azueta, Mexico

Lynwood

- Aguascalientes, Mexico
- Talpa de Allende, Mexico
- Zacatecas, Mexico

== M ==
Madera

- Yilan, Taiwan

Malibu

- Lijiang, China

Martinez

- Dunbar, Scotland, United Kingdom
- Hanchuan, China
- Isola delle Femmine, Italy
- Milazzo, Italy
- Stresa, Italy

Marysville

- Beigang (Yunlin), Taiwan

Mendocino

- Ōmachi, Japan

Menlo Park

- Bizen, Japan
- (Republic of Ireland) Galway, Ireland
- Kochi, India
- Xinbei (Changzhou), China

Merced

- Albury, Australia
- Somoto, Nicaragua

Millbrae

- Mosta, Malta
- La Serena, Chile

Milpitas

- Dagupan, Philippines
- Huizhou, China
- Tsukuba, Japan

Modesto

- Aguascalientes, Mexico
- Khmelnytskyi, Ukraine
- Kurume, Japan
- Laval, France
- Mengzi, China
- Vernon, Canada
- Vijayawada, India

Montebello

- Ashiya, Japan
- Stepanakert, Azerbaijan

Monterey

- Dubrovnik, Croatia
- Isola delle Femmine, Italy
- Kuşadası, Turkey
- Lankaran, Azerbaijan
- Lleida, Spain
- Nanao, Japan
- Tainan, Taiwan

Monterey Park

- Morelia, Mexico
- Nachikatsuura, Japan
- Quanzhou, China
- Yeongdeungpo (Seoul), South Korea
- Yonghe (New Taipei), Taiwan

Moreno Valley

- San Juan de los Lagos, Mexico

Morgan Hill

- Ameca, Mexico
- (Republic of Ireland) Headford, Ireland
- Mizuho, Japan
- San Casciano in Val di Pesa, Italy
- San Martín de Hidalgo, Mexico
- Seferihisar, Turkey

Mountain View

- Hasselt, Belgium
- Iwata, Japan

== N ==
Napa

- Casablanca, Chile
- Iwanuma, Japan
- Launceston, Australia

Nevada City

- Penzance, England, United Kingdom

Newport Beach

- Antibes, France
- Ensenada, Mexico
- Okazaki, Japan

Norwalk

- Hermosillo, Mexico
- Morelia, Mexico

Novato

- Greater Shepparton, Australia

== O ==
Oakland

- Bahir Dar, Ethiopia
- Dalian, China
- Da Nang, Vietnam
- Fukuoka, Japan
- Funchal, Portugal
- Livorno, Italy
- Nakhodka, Russia
- Ocho Rios, Jamaica
- Santiago de Cuba, Cuba
- Sekondi-Takoradi, Ghana

Oceanside

- Fuji, Japan
- Kisarazu, Japan
- Pago Pago, American Samoa

Ontario

- Ahome, Mexico
- Brockville, Canada
- Jieyang, China
- Mocorito, Mexico
- Salvador Alvarado, Mexico

Orange

- Orange, Australia
- Querétaro, Mexico
- Timaru, New Zealand

Orange County

- Tianjin, China

Orinda

- Tábor, Czech Republic

Oxnard

- Ocotlán, Mexico

== P ==
Pacifica

- Balaguer, Spain

Palm Desert

- Gisborne, New Zealand
- Zihuatanejo de Azueta, Mexico

Palmdale

- Poncitlán, Mexico

Palo Alto

- Albi, France
- Enschede, Netherlands
- Heidelberg, Germany
- Linköping, Sweden
- Oaxaca de Juárez, Mexico
- Palo, Philippines
- Tsuchiura, Japan
- Yangpu (Shanghai), China

Paramount

- Tepic, Mexico

Pasadena

- Dakar-Plateau, Senegal
- Järvenpää, Finland
- Ludwigshafen am Rhein, Germany
- Mishima, Japan
- Vanadzor, Armenia
- Xicheng (Beijing), China

Pico Rivera

- San Luis Potosí, Mexico

Pittsburg

- Isola delle Femmine, Italy
- Pohang, South Korea
- Shimonoseki, Japan
- Yahualica de González Gallo, Mexico

Pleasanton

- Blairgowrie and Rattray, Scotland, United Kingdom
- Fergus (Centre Wellington), Canada
- Tulancingo de Bravo, Mexico

Plymouth

- Jocotepec, Mexico

Porterville

- La Barca, Mexico
- Hamamatsu, Japan

== R ==
Rancho Cordova

- Turrialba, Costa Rica

Rancho Palos Verdes

- Sakura, Japan

Redlands

- Hino, Japan
- Linli, China
- San Miguel de Allende, Mexico

Redondo Beach

- Ensenada, Mexico
- Itoman, Japan
- La Paz, Mexico
- Zhangjiagang, China

Redwood City

- Aguililla, Mexico
- Colima, Mexico
- Zapotlán el Grande, Mexico
- Zhuhai, China

Reedley

- Tongyeong, South Korea

Richmond

- Regla (Havana), Cuba
- Shimada, Japan
- Zhoushan, China

Ridgecrest

- Tepatitlán de Morelos, Mexico

Rio Vista

- Tobishima, Japan

Riverbank

- Fuyang (Hangzhou), China
- Tamazula de Gordiano, Mexico

Riverside

- Cần Thơ, Vietnam
- Cuautla, Mexico
- Ensenada, Mexico
- Erlangen, Germany
- Gangnam (Seoul), South Korea
- Hyderabad, India
- Jiangmen, China
- Obuasi, Ghana
- Sendai, Japan

Rohnert Park

- Hashimoto, Japan

Rosemead

- Keelung, Taiwan
- Zapopan, Mexico

== S ==
Sacramento

- Ashkelon, Israel
- Bethlehem, Palestine
- Chișinău, Moldova
- Hamilton, New Zealand
- Jinan, China
- Liestal, Switzerland
- Manila, Philippines
- Matsuyama, Japan
- Mexicali, Mexico
- Pasay, Philippines
- San Juan de Oriente, Nicaragua
- Sumy, Ukraine
- Yongsan (Seoul), South Korea

Salinas

- Cebu City, Philippines
- (Republic of Ireland) Drogheda, Ireland
- Ichikikushikino, Japan
- Jerécuaro, Mexico
- Guanajuato, Mexico
- Seogwipo, South Korea
- Söke, Turkey

San Bernardino

- Centro, Mexico
- Goyang, South Korea
- Herzliya, Israel
- Ifẹ, Nigeria
- Kigali, Rwanda
- Mexicali, Mexico
- Roxas, Philippines
- Tachikawa, Japan
- Tauranga, New Zealand
- Yushu, China
- Zavolzhye, Russia

San Bernardino County

- Taoyuan, Taiwan

San Bruno

- Narita, Japan

San Carlos

- Metepec, Mexico
- Ōmura, Japan

San Clemente

- San Clemente del Tuyú, Argentina

San Diego

- Alcalá de Henares, Spain
- Campinas, Brazil
- Cavite City, Philippines
- Edinburgh, Scotland, United Kingdom
- Jalalabad, Afghanistan
- Jeonju, South Korea
- Leon, Mexico
- Marseille, France
- Masovian Voivodeship, Poland
- Panama City, Panama
- Perth, Australia
- Taichung City, Taiwan
- Tema, Ghana
- Tijuana, Mexico
- Vladivostok, Russia
- Yantai, China
- Yokohama, Japan

San Fernando

- Tepatitlán de Morelos, Mexico

San Francisco

- Abidjan, Ivory Coast
- Amman, Jordan
- Assisi, Italy
- Barcelona, Spain
- Bengaluru, India
- (Republic of Ireland) Cork, Ireland
- Haifa, Israel
- Ho Chi Minh City, Vietnam
- Kiel, Germany
- Kraków, Poland
- Manila, Philippines
- Seoul, South Korea
- Shanghai, China
- Sydney, Australia
- Taipei, Taiwan
- Thessaloniki, Greece
- Zurich, Switzerland

San Gabriel

- Celaya, Mexico
- Changhua, Taiwan

San Jose

- (Republic of Ireland) Dublin, Ireland
- Guadalajara, Mexico
- Okayama, Japan
- Pune, India
- San José, Costa Rica
- Tainan, Taiwan
- Veracruz, Mexico
- Yekaterinburg, Russia

San Leandro

- Naga, Philippines
- Ponta Delgada, Portugal
- Ribeirão Preto, Brazil

San Marino

- Tamsui (New Taipei), Taiwan

San Mateo

- Toyonaka, Japan

San Pablo

- Manzanillo, Mexico

San Rafael

- Chiang Mai, Thailand
- Falkirk, Scotland, United Kingdom
- Lonate Pozzolo, Italy
- San Rafael del Norte, Nicaragua

Santa Barbara

- Kotor, Montenegro
- Patras, Greece
- Puerto Vallarta, Mexico
- San Juan, Philippines
- Toba, Japan
- Weihai, China

Santa Clara

- Coimbra, Portugal
- Izumo, Japan
- (Republic of Ireland) Limerick, Ireland

Santa Clara County

- Florence Metropolitan City, Italy
- Hsinchu County, Taiwan

Santa Clarita

- Sariaya, Philippines
- Tena, Ecuador

Santa Cruz

- Alushta, Ukraine
- Biarritz, France
- Jinotepe, Nicaragua
- Sestri Levante, Italy
- Shingū, Japan

Santa Fe Springs

- Navojoa, Mexico
- Tirschenreuth, Germany

Santa Monica

- Fujinomiya, Japan
- Hamm, Germany
- Mazatlán, Mexico

Santa Rosa

- Cherkasy, Ukraine
- Jeju City, South Korea

Saratoga

- Mukō, Japan

Sausalito

- Cascais, Portugal
- Sakaide, Japan
- Viña del Mar, Chile

Scotts Valley

- Nichinan, Japan

Sebastopol

- Chyhyryn, Ukraine
- Takeo, Japan

Solvang

- Aalborg, Denmark

Sonoma

- Aswan, Egypt
- Chambolle-Musigny, France
- Greve in Chianti, Italy
- Kaniv, Ukraine
- Pátzcuaro, Mexico
- Penglai (Yantai), China
- Tokaj, Hungary

Sonora

- Kirishima, Japan

South El Monte

- Gómez Palacio, Mexico
- Kunshan, China

South San Francisco

- Atotonilco El Alto, Mexico
- Kishiwada, Japan
- Lucca, Italy
- Pasig, Philippines
- Saint-Jean-Pied-de-Port, France

Stockton

- Asaba, Nigeria
- Battambang, Cambodia
- Empalme, Mexico
- Foshan, China
- Iloilo City, Philippines
- Parma, Italy
- Shizuoka, Japan

Sunnyvale

- Iizuka, Japan

== T ==
Temecula

- Daisen, Japan

Temple City

- Hawkesbury, Australia
- Magdalena de Kino, Mexico

Thousand Oaks

- Qingdao, China

Torrance

- Kashiwa, Japan

Tracy

- Memuro, Japan
- Velas, Portugal

Tulare

- Angra do Heroísmo, Portugal
- Inverell, Australia

Tustin

- Heyuan, China

== U ==
Union City

- Asadabad, Afghanistan
- Baybay, Philippines
- Chiang Rai, Thailand
- Jalandhar, India
- Liyang, China
- Mulegé, Mexico
- Pasay, Philippines

Upland

- Caborca, Mexico
- Mildura, Australia

== V ==
Vallejo

- Akashi, Japan
- Bagamoyo, Tanzania
- Baguio, Philippines
- Jincheon, South Korea
- Trondheim, Norway

Ventura

- Loreto, Mexico

Visalia

- Miki, Japan
- Putignano, Italy

== W ==
Walnut

- Calamba, Philippines
- Yuyao, China

Walnut Creek

- Noceto, Italy
- Siófok, Hungary

Watsonville

- Cavtat (Konavle), Croatia
- Jocotepec, Mexico
- Kawakami, Japan
- Pinghu, China
- San Pedro Masahuat, El Salvador
- Tangancícuaro, Mexico

West Covina

- Fengtai (Beijing), China
- Ōtawara, Japan

West Sacramento

- Alaminos, Philippines

Whittier

- Changshu, China

Woodland

- La Piedad, Mexico

== Y ==
Yorba Linda

- Huai'an, China
- Tongchuan, China

Yountville

- Kaštela, Croatia
- Todos Santos (La Paz), Mexico

Yuba City

- Toride, Japan
