= 15th federal electoral district of Jalisco =

Federal electoral district of Mexico

Jalisco's 15th
- Electoral district of the Chamber of Deputies of Mexico

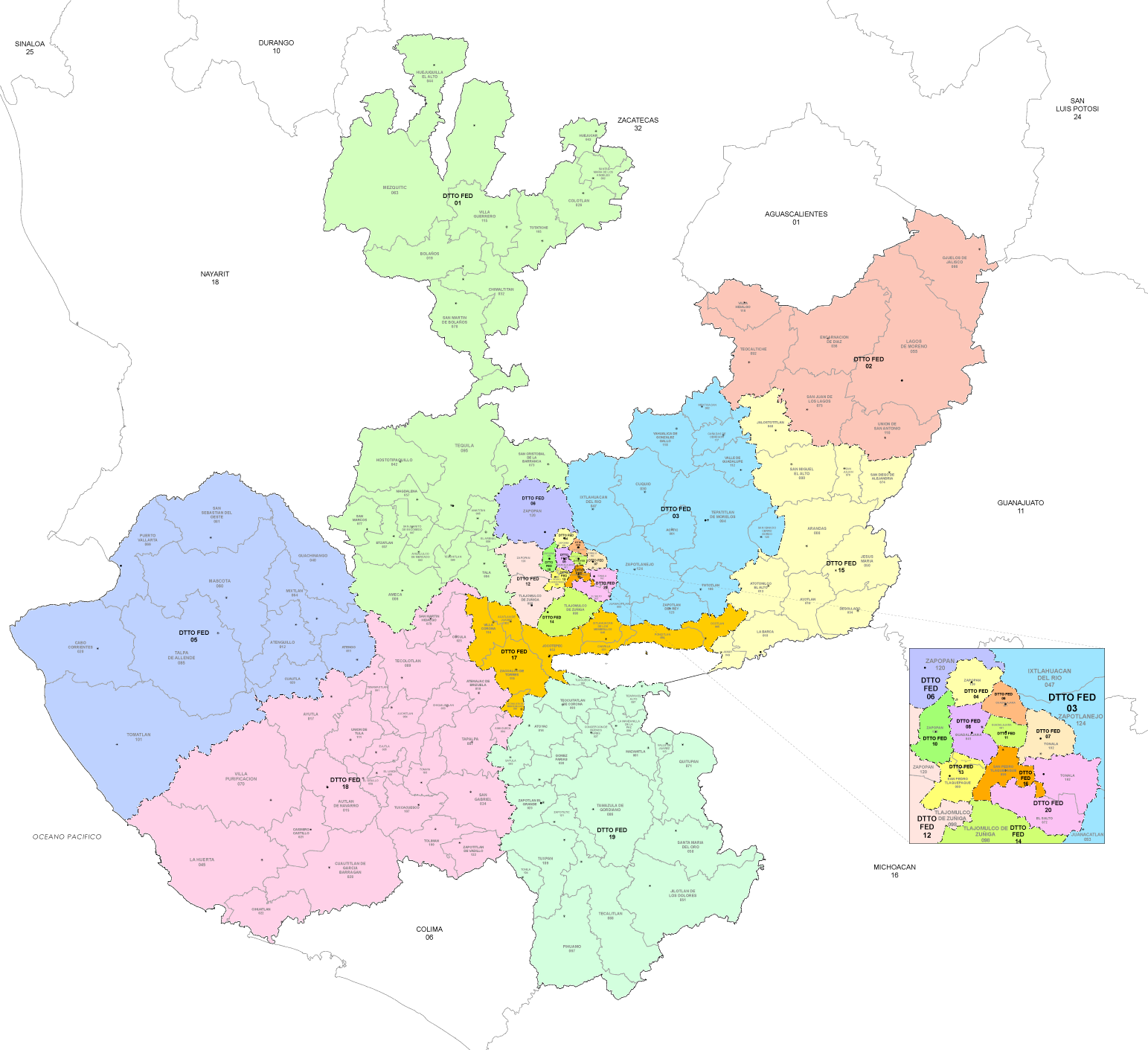
- 15th district

Incumbent
- Member: Alonso Vázquez Jiménez
- Party: ▌National Action Party
- Congress: 66th (2024–2027)

District
- State: Jalisco
- Head town: La Barca
- Coordinates: 20°17′N 102°34′W
- Covers: 11 municipalities: Arandas, Atotonilco el Alto, Ayotlán, La Barca, Degollado, Jalostotitlán, Jamay, Jesús María, San Diego de Alejandría, San Julián, San Miguel el Alto
- PR region: First
- Precincts: 210
- Population: 408,273 (2020 census)

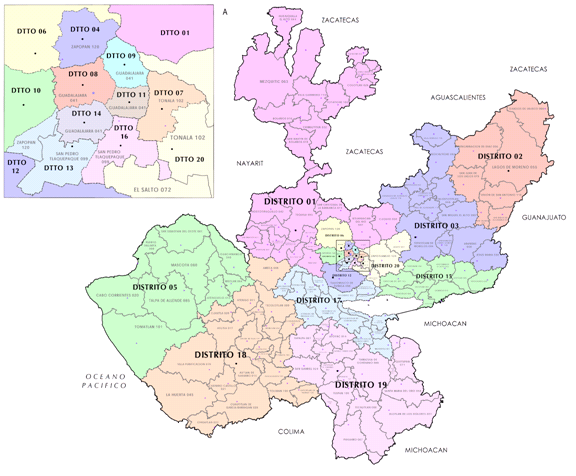
Jalisco's districts in 2017–2022

The 15th federal electoral district of Jalisco (Spanish: Distrito electoral federal 15 de Jalisco) is one of the 300 electoral districts into which Mexico is divided for elections to the federal Chamber of Deputies and one of 20 such districts in the state of Jalisco.

It elects one deputy to the lower house of Congress for each three-year legislative session by means of the first-past-the-post system. Votes cast in the district also count towards the calculation of proportional representation ("plurinominal") deputies elected from the first region.

Suspended in 1930, (Note: An amendment to Article 52 of the Constitution in 1928 changed the original provision of "one deputy per 60,000 inhabitants" to "one deputy per 100,000"; as a result, the size of the Chamber of Deputies fell from 281 in the 1928 election to 171 in 1934.) the 15th district was re-established as part of the 1977 electoral reforms. The restored district returned its first deputy in the 1979 mid-term election.

The current member for the district, elected in the 2024 general election, is Alonso de Jesús Vázquez Jiménez of the National Action Party (PAN).

== District territory ==
Under the 2023 districting plan adopted by the National Electoral Institute (INE), which is to be used for the 2024, 2027 and 2030 federal elections, Jalisco's 15th district is located in the east of the state, along the border with Guanajuato and Michoacán, and comprises 210 electoral precincts (secciones electorales) across 11 of the state's 125 municipalities:

- Arandas, Atotonilco el Alto, Ayotlán, La Barca, Degollado, Jalostotitlán, Jamay, Jesús María, San Diego de Alejandría, San Julián and San Miguel el Alto.

The head town (cabecera distrital), where results from individual polling stations are gathered together and tallied, is the city of La Barca. The district reported a population of 408,273 in the 2020 census.

== Previous districting schemes ==
Evolution of electoral district numbers
	1974	1978	1996	2005	2017	2023
Jalisco	13	20	19	19	20	20
Chamber of Deputies	196	300				

2017–2022

Jalisco regained its 20th congressional seat in the 2017 redistricting process. The 15th district's head town was at La Barca and it covered nine municipalities:
- Atotonilco el Alto, Ayotlán, La Barca, Degollado, Jamay, Ocotlán, Poncitlán, Tototlán and Zapotlán del Rey.

2005–2017

Under the 2005 plan, Jalisco had 19 districts. This district's head town was at La Barca and it covered nine municipalities:
- Atotonilco el Alto, Ayotlán, La Barca, Degollado, Jamay, Jesús María, Ocotlán, Tototlán and Zapotlán del Rey.

1996–2005

In the 1996 scheme, under which Jalisco lost a single-member seat, the district had its head town at La Barca and it comprised nine municipalities:
- Atotonilco el Alto, Ayotlán, La Barca, Degollado, Jamay, Ocotlán, Poncitlán, Tototlán and Zapotlán del Rey.

1978–1996

The districting scheme in force from 1978 to 1996 was the result of the 1977 electoral reforms, which increased the number of single-member seats in the Chamber of Deputies from 196 to 300. Under that plan, Jalisco's seat allocation rose from 13 to 20. The restored 15th district's head town was at Guadalajara, the state capital, and it covered a portion of the city's Hidalgo and Libertad sectors.

== Deputies returned to Congress ==
(Mexico) National parties
- Current
- PAN
- PRI
- PT
- PVEM
- MC
- Morena
- PAZ
- Somos
- Defunct or local only
- PLM
- PNR
- PRM
- PNM
- PP
- PPS
- PARM
- PFCRN
- CON
- PANAL
- PSD
- PES
- PES
- PRD

Jalisco's 15th district
Election	Deputy	Party	Term	Legislature
1916	José Manzano		1916–1917	Constituent Congress of Querétaro
...
The 15th district was suspended between 1930 and 1979
1979	Enrique Chavero Ocampo	Institutional Revolutionary Party	1979–1982	51st Congress
1982	Héctor Manuel Perfecto Rodríguez	Institutional Revolutionary Party	1982–1985	52nd Congress
1985	Félix Flores Gómez	Institutional Revolutionary Party	1985–1988	53rd Congress
1988	Gregorio Curiel Díaz	National Action Party (Mexico)	1988–1991	54th Congress
1991	Raúl Juárez Valencia	Institutional Revolutionary Party	1991–1994	55th Congress
1994	José Enrique Patiño Terán	National Action Party (Mexico)	1994–1997	56th Congress
1997	Juan José García de Quevedo	Institutional Revolutionary Party	1997–2000	57th Congress
2000	Sergio García Sepúlveda	National Action Party (Mexico)	2000–2003	58th Congress
2003	Patricia Elena Retamoza Vega	Institutional Revolutionary Party	2003–2006	59th Congress
2006	Gerardo Amezola Fonseca	National Action Party (Mexico)	2006–2009	60th Congress
2009	Gumercindo Castellanos Flores	National Action Party (Mexico)	2009–2012	61st Congress
2012	Ossiel Omar Niaves López	Institutional Revolutionary Party	2012–2015	62nd Congress
2015	Ramón Bañales Arambula	Institutional Revolutionary Party	2015–2018	63rd Congress
2018	Absalón García Ochoa	National Action Party (Mexico)	2018–2021	64th Congress
2021	Ana Laura Sánchez Velázquez	National Action Party (Mexico)	2021–2024	65th Congress
2024	Alonso de Jesús Vázquez Jiménez	National Action Party (Mexico)	2024–2027	66th Congress

== Presidential elections ==
Jalisco's 15th district
Election	District won by	Party or coalition	%
2018	Andrés Manuel López Obrador	Juntos Haremos Historia	44.0808
2024	Bertha Xóchitl Gálvez Ruiz	Fuerza y Corazón por México	44.7412
