= Zapotlán del Rey =

- Municipality and town
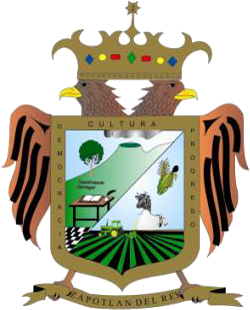
- Coat of arms

- Location in Mexico
- Coordinates: 20°28′2.712″N 102°55′29.352″W
- Country: Mexico
- State: Jalisco

Area
  - Total: 400 km^{2} (150 sq mi)
  - Town: 1.46 km^{2} (0.56 sq mi)

Population (2020 census)
  - Total: 19,279
  - Density: 48/km^{2} (120/sq mi)
  - Town: 3,330
  - Town density: 2,280/km^{2} (5,910/sq mi)
- Time zone: UTC-6 (Central Standard Time)
- Postal code: 45980
- Area code: 391
- Website: http://www.zapotlandelrey.jalisco.gob.mx/index.html

Zapotlán del Rey is a town and municipality in Jalisco in west-central Mexico. The municipality covers an area of 400 km^{2}.

This town became popular back in the years due to multiple UFO sightings and alleged extraterrestrial beings known as the greys around the highschool and nearby farms to the highschool.

Similar stories at nearby cities like Ocotlán, Jalisco.

As of 2005, the municipality had a total population of 16,274.

== Etymology ==
Zapotlán is derived from the Nahuatl word "Tzapotlán", and it means: "place where sapotes abound".

== History ==
Upon the arrival of the Spanish conquerors, the region was inhabited by Tecuexe and Nahua tribes and their dialect was Tepecuexe. The date of its foundation is unknown. Its primitive population settled to the northwest of the current population on the hill called "La Coronita" ("The Little Crown").

In 1529, Nuño de Guzmán sent Pedro Almíndez Chirino to conquer the eastern and northern region. Almíndez arrived in Tzapotlán and because it was King Spain's birthday day, he named it Zapotlán del Rey, a name that lasts to this day. As a sign of his passing through this town, he placed a wooden cross in the place where the atrium of the parish church is located today. In 1537 the encomendero Jorge Simón de Verapaz arrived, who wanted to force a group of native amerindians to go to found Santa Mónica de La Barca in the land of Chicnahuatenco. But they resisted, so Jorge Simón had the idea of setting fire to the Tepeltac neighborhood to force the indigenous people to emigrate. The group that founded La Barca was distinguished by its multi-colored clothing and by playing an instrument called chirimia. After the Conquest, this population continued under the authorities of the Spanish encomenderos with known slavery and mistreatment. On November 11, 1810, the liberator Miguel Hidalgo passed through this town with his army that came from the victory obtained in the Monte de las Cruces and was heading to Guadalajara to join with the insurgent José Antonio Torres, who had taken the city.

In 1888, Zapotlán de Rey belonged to Tototlán and in 1890 it was a borough of that same municipality with the category of town. It belonged to the Third Canton of La Barca. By decree number 1542, on 9 January 1913, Zapotlán del Rey was elevated to the category of municipality.

In recent years it became a popular municipality due to its multiple sightings of alleged extraterrestrial beings near Technical High School No. 95 and nearby farms.

== Coat of arms ==
=== Description ===
It is a coat of arms with a French shape, diagonally divided from upper right to lower left.

In the first canton you can see a landscape where the Hill of La Coronita ("The Little Crown") stands out in the background, as well as a sapote tree under which the following inscription appears: Zapotl = sapote, Tlan = place. In the foreground there is a desk on which there is an open book and an inkwell with a pen.

In the second canton it shows the figures of an ear of corn, a wheat spike, a bull, a cow, a tractor running on the furrows of a field.

On the golden border appears the legend: "DEMOCRACIA, CULTURA, PROGRESO".

By timbre or crest, a double-headed eagle of brown color, that wears a golden crown encrusted with gems.

In its claws the bird holds a golden ribbon where the official name of the municipality of ZAPOTLAN DEL REY is read.

The shield was designed by engineer Abel Morales Villaseñor and citizen José Martín Solís Godínez.

=== Meaning ===
The emblem that represents this municipality contains on its body elements that distinguish and characterize it in the region and in the state.

The Hill of La Coronita alludes to the site where the first inhabitants of Zapotlán, who belonged to the Naho Tecuexes, settled. In pre-Hispanic times this town belonged to the Coinan Tlatoanazgo.

The sapote tree and the words zapotl (sapote) and tlan (place) are the graphic representation of what the name of the municipality means, since the word Zapotlán translates as "place where sapotes abound", "place of sapotes" or "next to the sapotes".

The book and the inkwell with a pen on the desk symbolize education as one of the fundamental values for the inhabitants of this municipality.

The agricultural products, the bovine specimens and the tractor cultivating the field represent the agricultural branch as the main economic sector of the municipality.

The inscription on the border is the motto that distinguishes the natives of Zapotlán del Rey.

The double-headed eagle, the crown and the gold ribbon allude to the Spanish conquest of this place, in 1529, by Pedro Almíndez Chirinos. The day that Chirinos arrived in Tzapotlán was the date of the King of Spain's name day so, in honor of the monarch, he named this place Zapotlán del Rey, a name that lasts to this day.

The official colors of the shield are brown, green, and gold.

== Geography ==
=== Location ===
Zapotlán del Rey is located in the Southeast area of Jalisco, between the geographical coordinates 20°24′00″ to 20°34′00″ of north latitude and 102°45′30″ to 103°04′30″ of west longitude; at a height of 5085 feet over sea level (1550 meters).

The municipality borders to the North with the municipalities of Zapotlanejo and Tototlán; to the East with the municipalities of Tototlán and Ocotlán; to the South with the municipalities of Ocotlán and Poncitlán; to the West with the municipalities of Poncitlán, Juanacatlán, and Zapotlanejo.

=== Topography ===
Its surface is made up of flat areas (53%), rugged areas (27%) and semi-flat areas (20%).

Soils. The territory is made up of lands that belong to the Quaternary period. The subsoil is formed by acid extrusive rocks, volcanic breccia and tuff in the upper parts; in the hills and ridges of the lowlands there are conglomerates, sandstones and soils of lake formation. In the hills and slopes the composition of the soils is of predominant types Feozem Haplic and Luvic, associated with Vertisol Pelic; in the lower parts there is Ferric Luvisol with Eutric Planosol.

Area. The municipality has a land area of 79,296 acres (32,090 hectares), of which 24,036 acres are used for agricultural purposes, 42,630 acres in livestock activities, 7166 acres are for forestry use, 546 acres are for urban land and 4917 acres have other uses. As far as property is concerned, an area of 34,451 acres is private and another of 37,253 acres is ejidal; 7591 acres are communal property.

=== Hydrography ===
Its hydrological resources are provided by the Río Santiago, which comes from the South. In the central region of the municipality is located the La Colonia dam, and to the north, the Rincón de Chila spring. There are also brooks: Agua Caliente, Cañada de Chila, El Sauz, Tepehuaje, Rincón de la Cañada, Agua Fría, Los Sabinos, Ladronera Prieto, and Humarán. There are also several springs: Agua Caliente, Zapotlán, and Cañada, as well as the dams: La Cañada, and Chila.

=== Climate ===
The climate is semi-dry, winters and spring dry, and semi-warm. No well-defined winter thermal change. The average annual temperature is 68°F, with a maximum of 82.5°F and a minimum of 54.5°F. It has an average rainfall of 819.1 millimeters. The annual average number of days with frost is 12. The prevailing winds are from the West in the months of January to May, and from the East in the months of June to December.

=== Flora and fauna ===
Its vegetation is basically made up of pine, oak, natural pastures, kidneywood, and tepehuaje, without actually forming wooded areas.

Deers, rabbits, hares, squirrels, some reptiles, and smaller species, as well as a great variety of birds, inhabit this region.

== Economy ==
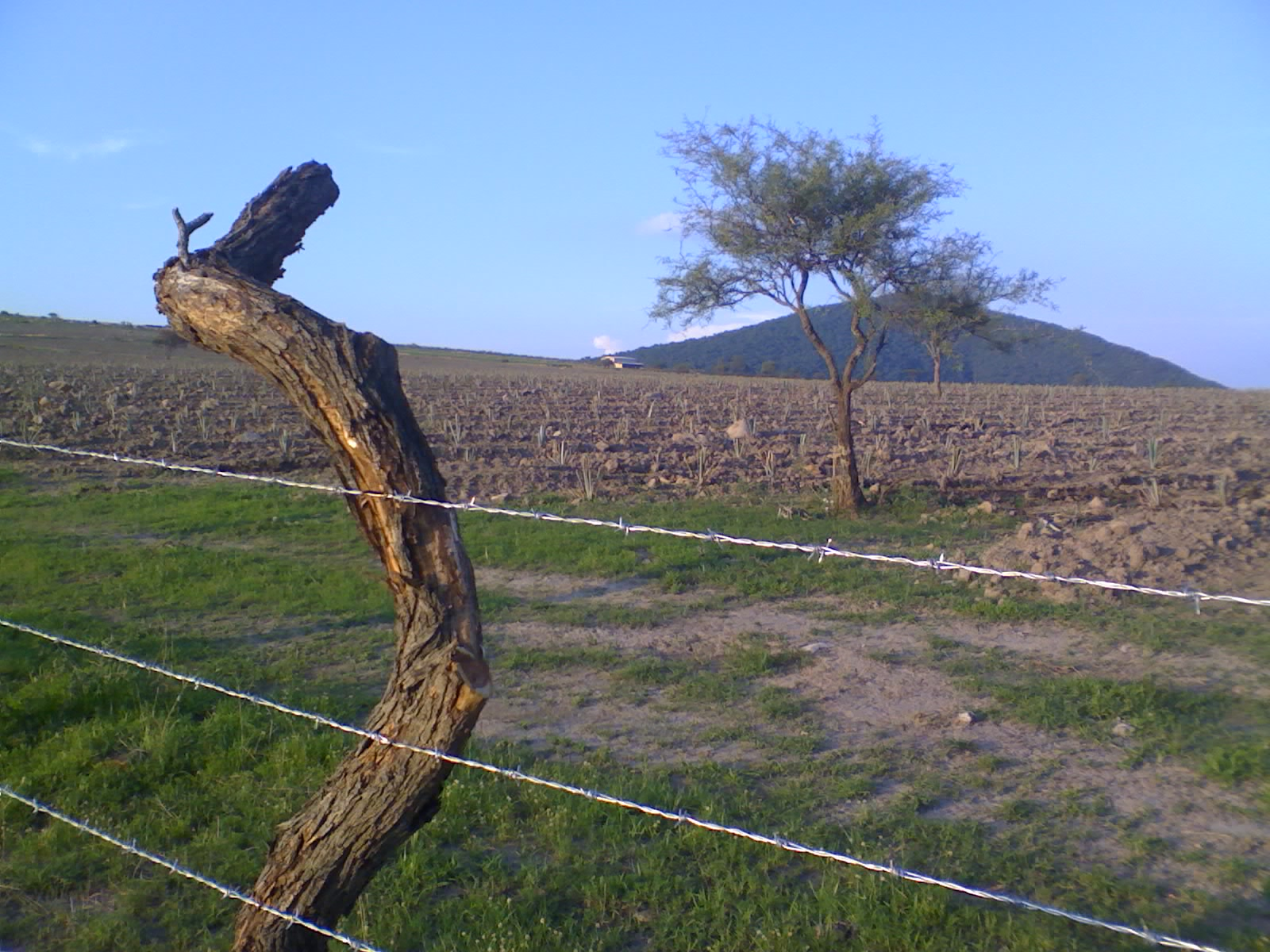
Agave cultivation, north of "El Salto"

Cattle raising. Cattle, horses, goats, and pigs are raised. Besides, there are beehives.

Farming. Corn, sorghum, wheat, chickpea, and agave stand out.

Commerce. Establishments dedicated to the sale of basic necessities and mixed shops that sell various items predominate.

Industry. The main industrial activity is manufacturing. In the municipality, out of town, there is a tequila distiller and bottler called Destiladora de Agave Hacienda Los Huajes.

Services. Technical, communal, social, personal, administrative, and maintenance services are provided.

Media. There is a newspaper called El Informativo de Zapotlán del Rey.

== Education ==
The municipality of Zapotlán del Rey has facilities which serve to the following levels of education:

Preschool.

Primary.

Secondary. Technical Secondary School No. 95 stands out.

Preparatory. A preparatory school managed by the University of Guadalajara.

== Government ==
The form of government is democratic and depends on Jalisco state government, and federal government. Elections are held every three years, when the municipal president and her/his council are elected.

=== Municipal presidents ===
Term	Municipal president	Political party	Notes
01/01/1983–31/12/1985	Álvaro Maldonado Flores	PRI	
01/01/1986–31/12/1988	Raúl Hernández Hernández	PRI	
01/01/1989–1992	Jaime Castellanos Flores	PRI	
1992–1993	J. Jesús Castellanos Plascencia	PRI	
1993–1995	Rosalío González Guerrero	PRI	
01/01/1995–31/12/1997	Silverio Anaya Baldovinos	PRI	
01/01/1998–31/12/2000	J. Merced García Gama	PRI	
01/01/2001–31/12/2003	Juan Flores Ramírez	PRI	
01/01/2004–??/04/2006	Gumercindo Castellanos Flores	PAN	
??/04/2006–31/12/2006	Hugo Armando Escobar Sahagún	PAN	Acting municipal president
01/01/2007–31/12/2009	Daniel Nápoles Herrera	PRI	
01/01/2010–30/09/2012	Carlos Omar Godínez Nápoles	PAN	
01/10/2012–30/09/2015	J. Jesús Cuevas García	PRI; PVEM	Coalition "Compromise for Jalisco"
01/10/2015–30/09/2018	Celso Flores Hernández	PRD	
01/10/2018–30/09/2021	Saúl Padilla Gutiérrez	PVEM	
01/10/2021–30/09/2024	Saúl Padilla Gutiérrez	MC	Reelected municipal president
01/10/2024–	Juan Manuel Godínez Padilla	MC	

== Tourism ==
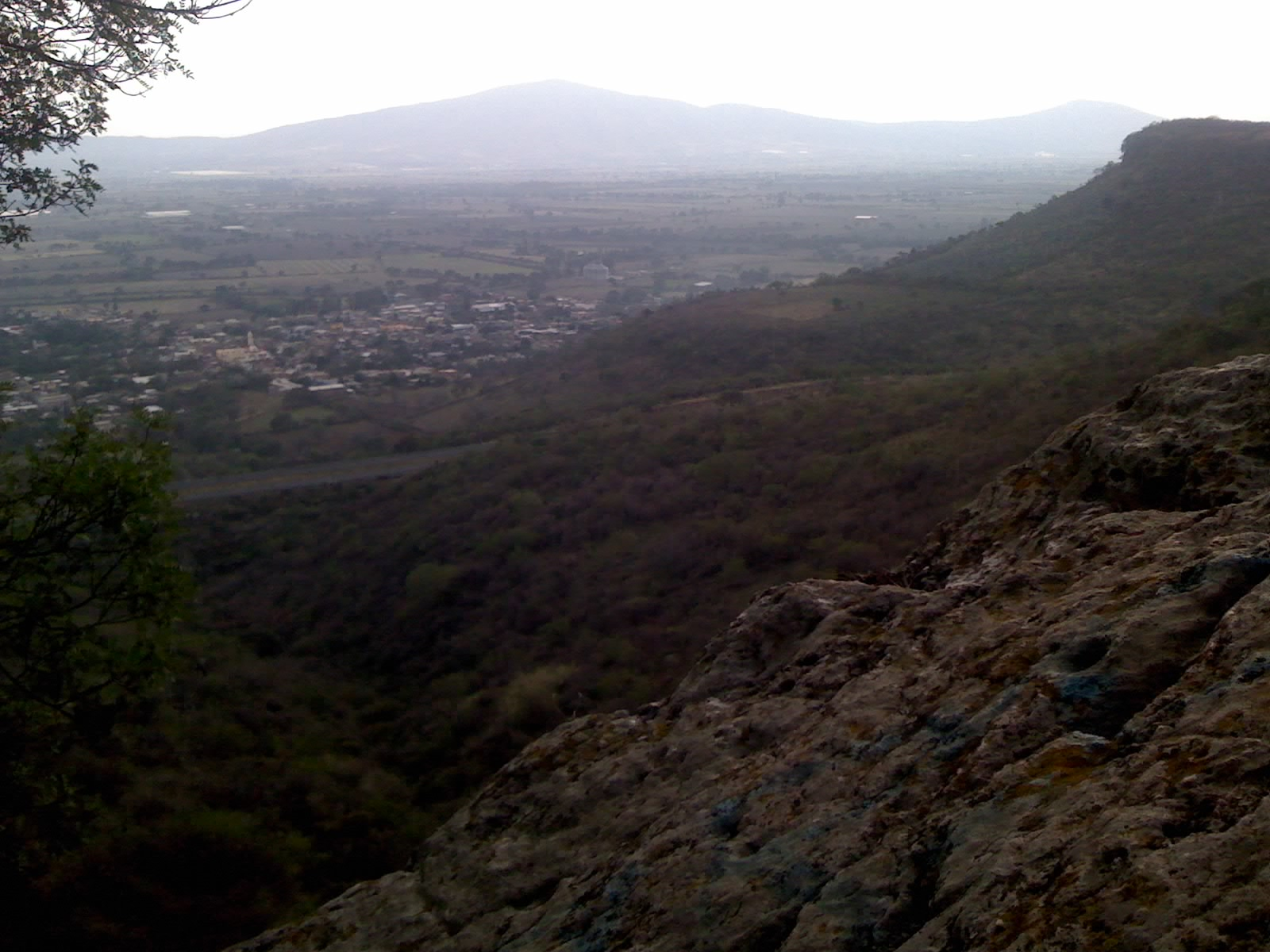
A view from "El Salto", a cloudy day

Architecture

- Former haciendas.

Handicrafts

- Elaboration of: textiles, carved wood, tule furniture, ceramics and cabinetmaking.

Spas

- Parque Agua Caliente (Hot Water Park) – Los Pocitos (The Little Water Wells).
- El Tanque de la Cañada – The Tank of the Glen.
- Agua Caliente del Tejocote – Hot Water of the Hawthorn

Churches

- Parish temple of la Santísima Trinidad (The Most Holy Trinity).

Parks and reserves

- Hot Water Park – Los Pocitos.
- Cerro El Salto — Hill The Jump.
- Viewpoint at Cerro Grande (Viewpoint at Large Hill).
- Los Sabinos de Chila – The Savins of Chila.
- Agua Caliente del Tejocote – Hot Water of the Hawthorn.

== Feasts ==
Civil festivals

- Anniversary of the foundation, January 15.

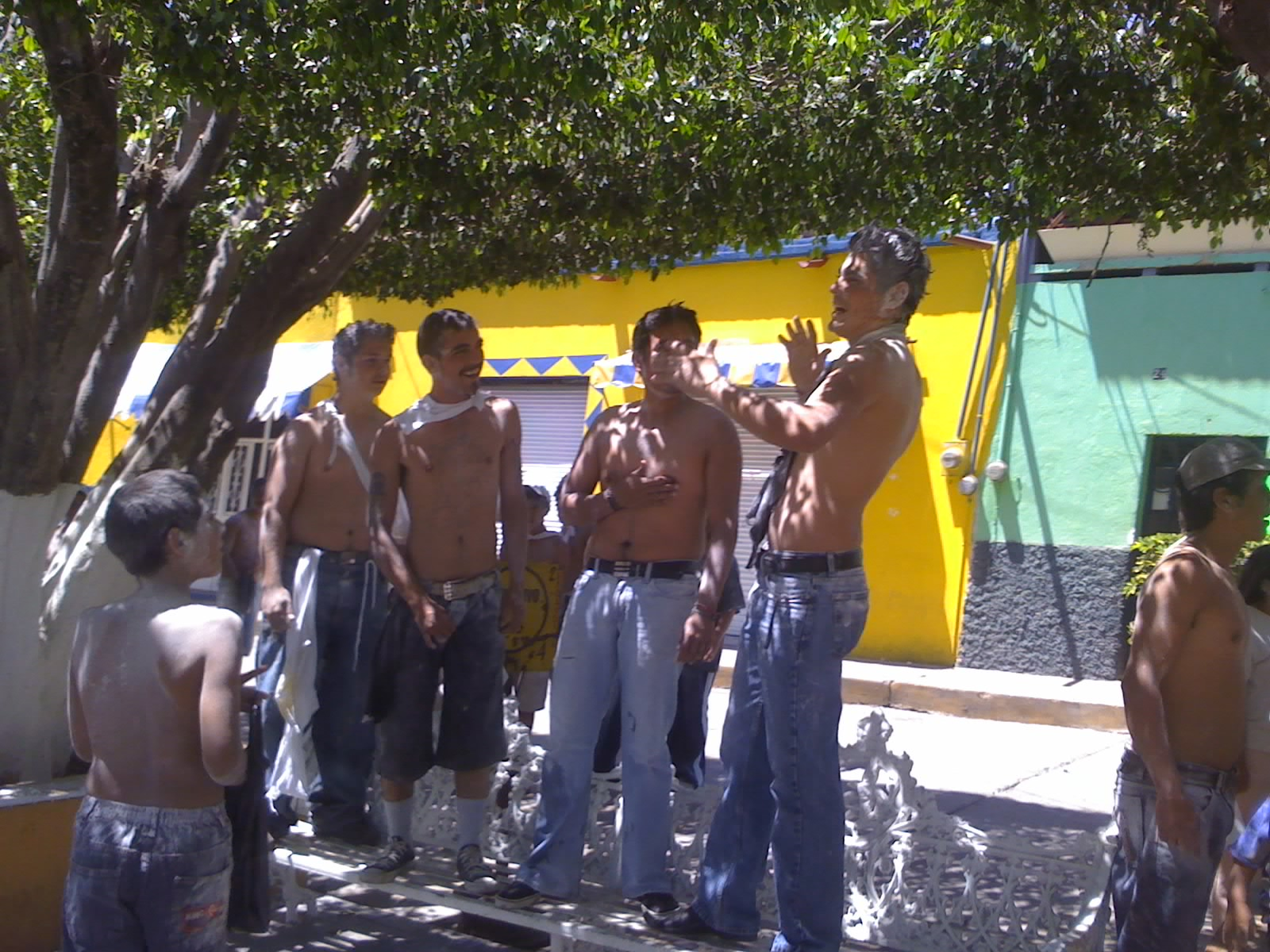
In the "Burning of Judas" people go through the whole town with the band, while they fight with flour and eggs, they end up in the square, and burn a Judas Iscariot effigy by using "squib crackers"

Religious festivals

- The meeting of the Child and the Virgin, October 17.
- Party in honor of Our Lady of Help. Last Sunday in October.
- Traditional Burning of Judas.
