= La Barca =

La Barca may refer to:

- La Barca Municipality, Jalisco, Mexico
- "La Barca", a 1957 Mexican song by Roberto Cantoral
