= Viet Mercury =

- Front page of the final issue on November 11, 2005
- Type: Weekly newspaper (daily from March 2003)
- Format: Tabloid
- Owner: Knight Ridder
- Publisher: De Tran
- Editor: Hoang Xuan Nguyen
- Launched: January 29, 1999; 27 years ago
- Ceased publication: November 11, 2005; 20 years ago
- Language: Vietnamese
- Headquarters: San Jose, California
- City: San Jose, California
- Country: United States
- Circulation: 35,000 (as of October 2005)
- Sister newspapers: San Jose Mercury News; Nuevo Mundo
- OCLC number: 47258670

Viet Mercury (Vietnamese: Việt Mercury) was a Vietnamese-language newspaper serving the Vietnamese American community in San Jose and the surrounding Silicon Valley area in California. It was published weekly by the San Jose Mercury News from 1999 to 2005; it also published daily for a time. It was the first Vietnamese-language newspaper published by an English-language daily, as well as the first non-Hispanic ethnic newspaper published by a major American company. Along with the Spanish-language Nuevo Mundo, it was one of two non-English weekly newspapers published by the Mercury News.

== Content ==
Viet Mercury was written in Vietnamese. Between 15% and 20% of Viet Mercury's stories also ran in English in the Mercury News, half were translated from wire reports, and original reporting by the paper's staff accounted for the rest of the stories.

Viet Mercury adhered to mainstream journalistic standards. Its reports avoided taking sides on contentious issues, in contrast to the community-owned papers, which often engaged in advocacy journalism. Like English-language publications, it referred to the former South Vietnamese capital as "Ho Chi Minh City" rather than "Saigon".

Whereas community-owned papers' advertisers were mostly Vietnamese-owned businesses, Viet Mercury attracted non-Vietnamese-owned businesses through bundled deals that also included space in the Mercury News and Nuevo Mundo. Web banners were also available on the VietMercury.com website. The September 3, 1999, issue was 176 pages long, 80% of it taken up by advertising. An issue in March 2000 was nearly 200 pages long, 75% of it advertising.

== History ==
In the 1990s, Santa Clara County was home to some 120,000 Vietnamese Americans, who owned over 5,000 businesses. The greater San Francisco Bay Area was even more Vietnamese speakers, one of the largest concentrations in the United States. A two-year-long market study sponsored by Knight Ridder found that 58% of Vietnamese-American newspaper readers preferred to read stories in Vietnamese instead of English. Another study put this figure higher, at 93%. Other research found that Vietnamese residents of San Jose read three or four newspapers per day. In 1998, there were 14 local Vietnamese newspapers, four of them publishing daily.

During this time, the San Jose Mercury News expanded its coverage of the area's ethnic communities, to national acclaim, hiring Vietnamese-speaking reporters for the first time. Mercury News articles on Vietnamese American topics were regularly translated and republished in Vietnamese-language newspapers nationwide. In 1994, after the United States lifted its trade embargo on Vietnam (see United States–Vietnam relations), the Mercury News opened a foreign bureau in Hanoi, becoming the first of two American daily newspapers to have a presence in Vietnam after the Vietnam War. The Mercury News occasionally ran stories translated into Vietnamese.

The Vietnamese-language weekly magazine Thị Trường Tự Do (Free Market) had planned to expand into a broadsheet as a joint venture with the Mercury News. However, Thị Trường Tự Do and Mercury News publisher Jay T. Harris disagreed over who would own a controlling interest in the paper, and the deal fell through. Viet Magazine also attempted unsuccessfully to form a joint venture with the Mercury News.

Some time later, on January 29, 1999, the Mercury News published the first issue of Viet Mercury, to mixed reviews from the local Vietnamese community. Some appreciated the new paper's news coverage, while others were opposed to Knight Ridder's approach of competing with community papers instead of partnering with them. With an initial weekly circulation of about 17,500 that grew to 23,600 the following year, it dwarfed each of the Vietnamese-owned weeklies in an already crowded market. Owners of existing dailies and weeklies complained of unfair competition for advertisers and accused Mercury News publisher Knight Ridder of attempting to kill the independent ethnic press. On the other hand, Harris sent a letter to competing newspapers implying that they had stolen his issues from news racks. Within months of Viet Mercury's publication, Vietnam Family (Gia Đình) and another Vietnamese paper failed. Viet Mercury became profitable in 2000. With circulation rising to 35,000, Viet Mercury began publishing daily in March 2003.

Unlike its competitors, Viet Mercury operated like a mainstream news outlet, with a full-time staff that produced original reporting and had access to the Mercury News Hanoi bureau. An investigative series by Viet Mercury uncovered doctors embezzling money from recent immigrants, leading to the arrests of several doctors. Viet Mercury also uncovered a Medicare fraud scheme in 2003 in collaboration with Mercury News reporters.

Advertising revenues fell after the dot-com bubble ended, causing Viet Mercury to operate at a loss. On October 21, 2005, the Mercury News announced the sale of Viet Mercury to a group of Vietnamese-American investors led by Jim Nguyen. The proposed sale was controversial within the local Vietnamese community, because Nguyen had worked to promote closer economic ties with Communist-led Vietnam, including the naming of Ho Chi Minh City as a sister city of San Francisco in 1995. The paper published its final issue on November 11, 2005, and it was expected that the investors would begin publication of a successor, VietUSA News, on December 2. However, the deal fell through.

Two community-owned newspapers were founded in the wake of Viet Mercury's closure. Former Viet Mercury managing editor Hoang Xuan Nguyen founded the alternative weekly Viet Tribune, while editor and publisher De Tran founded VTimes.

== Distribution ==
Viet Mercury was distributed free of charge on Fridays at 500 locations, including restaurants, medical offices, and newsracks. In its final year of publication, Viet Mercury had a weekly circulation of 35,000, ranking first among nine Vietnamese-language newspapers in the San Jose market. It had subscribers from outside the local market, including from Sydney and Biloxi, Mississippi. According to the Mercury News, Viet Mercury was read within Vietnam, particularly by government officials, as the paper was valued for its Overseas Vietnamese perspective.

Viet Mercury content was also available online on VietMercury.com, which was initially a separate website then later a section of the Mercury News website. Vietnamese text was encoded in the VNI character encoding.

== Notable people ==
Editors:

- Hoang Xuan Nguyen – author

Contributors:

- Toan Quy Do – financial columnist, Nguoi Viet Daily News editor
- Anh Van Vu – Nguoi Viet Daily News editor
