= Sergio García Sepúlveda =

Mexican politician

Member of the Chamber of Deputies for Jalisco's 15th district
- In office 1 September 2000 – 31 August 2003
- Preceded by: Juan José García de Quevedo
- Succeeded by: Patricia Retamoza Vega

Personal details
- Born: 3 March 1963 (age 63) Atotonilco el Alto, Jalisco, Mexico
- Party: PAN
- Occupation: Politician

Sergio García Sepúlveda (born 3 March 1963) is a Mexican politician from the National Action Party (PAN). In the 2000 general election, he was elected to the Chamber of Deputies to represent Jalisco's 15th district during the 58th session of Congress.
