= Manuel Enríquez =

Mexican composer, violinist and pedagogue

Manuel Enríquez Salazar (17 June 1926 – 26 April 1994) was a Mexican composer, violinist and pedagogue. He was a fellow member of the Academy of Arts of Mexico, of the National Seminary of Mexican Culture and the music director of the National Institute of Fine Arts.

== Life ==
Enríquez was born in Ocotlán, Jalisco, and studied composition with Miguel Bernal Jiménez in Mexico. A scholarship from the Instituto Mexico-Norteamericano of Guadalajara enabled him to continue his education at the Juilliard School in New York, where he studied violin with Ivan Galamian, chamber music with Louis Persinger, and composition with Peter Mennin and Stefan Wolpe, from whom he learned about serial techniques. From the 1960s through the 1980s he had a meteoric career as a violinist, composer, and music administrator. Starting in the 1960s he was most prominent representative of the avant-garde in Mexico (Béhague 1994; Saavedra 2001).

In 1954 Enríquez debuted as a soloist in his own Concerto No. 1 for violin and orchestra, performed in Teatro Degollado in Guadalajara under the direction of Eisenberg. Continuing his studies at the Mexican-American Institute of Guadalajara, he received a scholarship to transfer to New York (1955). By the end of 1958 he traveled to Mexico City became a violinist and assistant director of chorus of Orquesta Sinfónica Nacional de México.

== Compositional style ==
Enríquez's early works, starting with the Suite for Violin and Piano in 1949 through the First String Quartet (1959) were in the nationalist neoclassism widespread in Mexico at that time, featuring folk-like tunes in dissonant harmonies and with propulsive rhythms including frequent syncopation and hemiola. In the early 1960s he adopted a loose form of twelve-tone technique, combined with minimalist designs. Characteristic examples are his Second Symphony (1962) and Pentamúsica for wind quintet (1963). In later works, such as Transición for orchestra (1965), the Second String Quartet and Ambivalencia for violin and cello (both 1967), and Díptico I for flute and piano (1969) he began to experiment with aleatory procedures and graphic notation. Aleatory, contrapuntal, and soloistic passages alternating with long timbral blocks are characteristic of his music though the 1960s and 70s, while his last works returned to strong, lyrical melodies, as in the Fourth String Quartet (1983), and finally to a recasting of his earlier nationalist style within freer, contrasting structures, as in his Fifth String Quartet (1988) (Saavedra 2001).

== Awards and honors ==
- Fellow of the Academy of Arts of Mexico, of the National Seminary of Mexican Culture and the SACM .
- Music Director of the National Institute of Fine Arts .
- Juror in the International Composition Competition "Carlos Chavez" (1986).
- Music Advisor of the President of the National Arts Centre of Mexico.
- He received the medal "José Clemente Orozco," Jalisco Award, the medal "Elias Sourasky" the diploma Mexican Union of Theatre and Music, he won the National Prize of Fine Arts in 1983, and obtained Medal "Mozart" Domecq Cultural Foundation and the Austrian Embassy in Mexico.
