= José Abraham Cisneros Gómez =

Mexican politician (born 1969)

- Born: 24 May 1969 (age 56); Jalisco, Mexico
- Occupation: Politician
- Political party: PAN

José Abraham Cisneros Gómez (born 24 May 1969) is a Mexican politician from the National Action Party (PAN). In the 2000 general election he was elected to the Chamber of Deputies to represent Jalisco's 8th district during the 58th session of Congress.
