= José Trinidad Padilla =

Mexican politician (born 1957)

- Born: 22 December 1957 (age 68); Guadalajara, Jalisco, Mexico
- Occupation: Politician
- Political party: PRI

José Trinidad Padilla López (born 22 December 1957) is a Mexican politician from the Institutional Revolutionary Party (PRI). In the 2009 mid-terms he was elected to the Chamber of Deputies to represent Jalisco's 8th district during the 61st session of Congress.
