= Sabás Reyes Salazar =

Mexican Catholic priest and saint

Saint Sabás Reyes Salazar
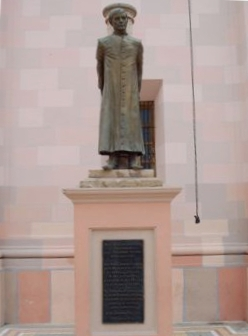
- Statue of Sabás Reyes Salazar in Cocula, Jalisco
- Born: December 5, 1883; Cocula, Jalisco, Mexico
- Died: April 13, 1927 (aged 43); Tototlán, Jalisco, Mexico
- Venerated in: Roman Catholic Church
- Beatified: November 22, 1992 by Pope John Paul II
- Canonized: May 21, 2000 by Pope John Paul II
- Feast: April 13
- Patronage: Helper of orphans

Sabás Reyes Salazar (3 December 1883 – 13 April 1927) was a Mexican Catholic vicar and one of many priests martyred during the Cristero War. Reyes was canonized by Pope John Paul II on 21 May 2000 as one the Martyrs of the Cristero War.

== Life ==
Sabás Reyes Salazar was born in Cocula, Jalisco, on 3 December 1883. Born into a poor family, he sold newspaper in Guadalajara before he entered there a conciliar seminary. As he was not particularly intellectually gifted, his superiors suggested him to join a diocese with few priests. In 1911, he was ordained and became a diocesan priest in the diocese of Tamaulipas. The tumultuous events of the Mexican Revolution forced him to regress to Guadalajara in 1914. Here he was priest in various parishes until June 1921 when he was moved to Tototlán, Jalisco. Reyes had a special devotion to the Trinity and often invoked the souls in purgatory. In Tototlan he served as confessor and was specifically dedicated to the formation of children and young adults, both in catechesis as well as teaching of sciences, arts and music. He used various didactic methods, including dramatic representations, in order to teach them.

In 1926, at the start of the persecutions during the Cristero War, Reyes became vicar of Tototlán and continued his ministry in secret. He was returning from a baptism when government forces arrived at the village looking for the parish priest, Francisco Vizcarra. Reyes went subsequently into hiding, but was discovered and arrested on orders of general Juan B. Izaguirre on 11 April 1927. Reyes was then beaten and tortured in order to reveal the whereabouts of Vizcarra and other priests; his hands and feet were burned and he was left in the sun with several of his bones broken, with nothing to drink. On 13 April, Wednesday of Holy Week, he was then taken to the cemetery and shot. Reyes's last words were Viva Cristo Rey.

== Legacy ==
On 21 May 2000, Sabás Reyes Salazar was canonised by Pope John Paul II among 24 other martyrs of the Cristero War.

== Sources ==
- Burns, Paul (15 June 2005). Butler's Saints of the Third Millennium: Butler's Lives of the Saints: Supplementary Volume. Bloomsbury Publishing. ISBN 978-1-4411-3077-8.
- Cervantes, Luis Laureán (26 April 2022). San José Sánchez del Río y mártires de México. Encuentro. ISBN 978-84-1339-437-4.
- Watkins, Basil (19 November 2015). The Book of Saints: A Comprehensive Biographical Dictionary. Bloomsbury Publishing. ISBN 978-0-567-66415-0.
- "Sabas Reyes Salazar". www.vatican.va. Vatican.
