= Jay T. Harris =

African-American journalist

- Born: December 3, 1948 (age 77); Washington D.C., District of Columbia, United States
- Education: Lincoln University, Santa Clara University
- Occupations: Journalist, journalism educator, newspaper publishing chief executive
- Years active: 47 years
- Employer(s): Reporter with the Wilmington News-Journal, Assistant Professor of Journalism and Urban Affairs at Medill, Associate Director of the Urban Journalism Center at Medill, Associate Dean at Medill, Gannett News Services, Washington D.C., National Correspondent, 1982–1985; Philadelphia Daily News, Executive Editor, 1985–1988, and Vice-President of Philadelphia Newspapers, 1987–1988; Knight-Ridder Newspapers, Miami, FL, assistant to the President, 1988–1989, Vice-President of Operations, 1989–1993; San Jose Mercury News, San Jose, CA, Chair and Publisher, 1994–2001.
- Known for: Journalistic Traditionalist, Most influential minority newspaper executives in the United States.
- Spouse: Married (Name not mentioned)
- Children: 3 Children (Names not mentioned)
- Parents: Richard James Harris (father); Margaret Estelle Burr Harris (mother)
- Awards: NABJ Hall of Fame Honoree, 1992; Ida B. Wells Award Winner, Par Excellence Award, Operation Push (1984)

Jay T. Harris (born December 3, 1948), an African-American journalist; journalism educator at the Medill School of Journalism, Northwestern University in Chicago, Illinois; and chairman and publisher of the San Jose Mercury News in San Jose, California, United States. He is a self-described "journalistic traditionalist" and stepped down as publisher as a statement about how the newspaper industry's emphasis on profits was harming its public mission. He was inducted into the Hall of Fame of the National Association of Black Journalists in 1992.

== Personal ==
Jay T. Harris was born December 3, 1948, in Washington D.C., United States. He is the son of Richard James Harris and Margaret Estelle Burr Harris. Harris graduated with honorary doctorate degrees in English from Lincoln University in Pennsylvania and Santa Clara University in California. While at Lincoln, he was the editor of the university's student newspaper. Harris is married and has three children. He lives in Los Gatos, California.

== Career ==
He started his first job as a reporter for the Wilmington News-Journal from 1970 to 1975. He was a journalism professor at the Medill School of Journalism at Northwestern University in Chicago from 1975 to 1982. In 1982, he moved to Washington D.C. where he worked as a news columnist and national correspondent for the Gannett News Service. The public trust came as a conviction of newspapers to the Knight Ridder in 1985, that without profit improvement and business, how would they be able to form a strong, yet manageable business. He became the executive editor for the Philadelphia Daily News in 1985. Harris moved on to join the Knight Ridder, the parent company of one of Mercury News. He was newspaper publishing chief executive in San Jose for Mercury News from 1994 to 2001.

Harris became responsible for nine other newspaper companies, when he was promoted to vice president of operations. For Harris's work in journalism, he received awards from different universities, public benefits and social justice organizations. On March 19, 2001, Harris officially resigned as publisher for the San Jose Mercury News. The Knight Ridder found out from Harris himself, that he resigned instead of accepting stiff budgeting targets that made it inevitable to have layoffs and that Harris knew would harm quality. Jay Harris then presented a speech, in which he made clear that he was urging editors to put readers first, which was his target from the beginning. He wanted to make quality and profits an equal priority for newspapers. Other journalists, however, believed that it was his inflexibility that led to his resignation. After Harris's resignation, the pressure was on the San Jose Mercury News to show it was preserving quality and in that same year they added 30 new journalists to help out with Silicon Valley when it became popular. He joined the faculty of Journalism and Communication at the University of Southern California in 2002.

Starting in 2000, Harris was the chair of the board of the Bay Area Council and was a member of the boards of a variety of different organizations, which included the American Press Institute, the Pacific Council on International Policy and also the Council on Foreign Relations.

== Notable works of journalism ==
Jay T. Harris worked for the MEDIA OUTLET in San Jose, California.

Jay T. Harris was working at his school newspaper while in college but didn't consider a career in journalism until he was hired by Fred Hartmann, editor Times-Union in Jacksonville, Florida, for a summer internship. After Harris graduated, Hartmann guided him and another correspondent through an 18-month investigative task to distinguish the 10 most dynamic heroin merchants in Wilmington, an undertaking that ended up being one of the first in computer-assisted investigative journalism. The project won the 1972 Associated Press Managing Editors' Public Service Award.

Jay Harris is credited with expanding the San Jose Mercury News coverage of an increasingly diverse population. The paper launched Nuevo Mundo, a Spanish-language paper, in 1996 and Viet Mercury for the valley's substantial Vietnamese community in 1999. However, it was his eagerness to grow the business division to cover the internet insurgency that helped the paper's notoriety and earned him fans in the newsroom. On October 5, 2000, Jay T. Harris presented the annual Frederick S. Siebert lecture at Michigan State University, which was co-sponsored by Michigan Press Association. Harris entitled the speech "Press Freedoms and the Responsibility of Journalists in the age of New Media".

Harris was hailed as the country's top African-American publisher of a daily paper and was known for his support for newsroom diversity. He put in seven years at the Mercury News, which was positioned as one of the 10 best daily papers in the nation by the Columbia Journalism Review while he was in charge of extending the paper's business and innovation scope. He composed and propelled the American Society of Newspaper Editors' yearly national registration of minority work in day by day daily papers, which remains the business benchmark. While at the Mercury News, Harris built a diverse news staff, having 30 percent minorities.

== Context ==
In April 2001, Harris addressed the American Society of Newspaper Editors on his rationale for resigning. Richard A. Oppel, editor of the American-Statesman in Austin, Texas and ASNE's outgoing president, said: "History will record this was the most effective and critical discourse at any point given at ASNE." The ASNE convention happened to coincide with a report, entitled "Voices of Anger, Cries of Concern", issued by journalists from the National Association of Black Journalists on the toll that industry layoffs were having on the diversity of news staffs. On May 10, 2001, Harris wrote an opinion piece for Nation magazine that further advanced his resignation speech before his colleagues. He argued that newspapers, like hospitals, were stewards who acted in the public interest and that acting to safeguard those interests at times would outweigh business decisions.

After Harris's resignation, Knight Ridder tried to assure Mercury News workers that it would like to stay away from cutbacks and layoffs in order to cover Silicon Valley. Jerome Ceppos, Knight Ridder's vice president for news, responded by pointing out that the Knight-Ridder staff had been increased to 403 writer but would see a decline in about 10 to 15 positions in the next year.

== Awards ==
- Associated Press Award (1972)
- NABJ, Hall of Fame (1992)
- NABJ, Ida B. Wells Award Winner (1992)

== See also ==
- National Association of Black Journalists Hall of Fame
