= Gerardo Amezola Fonseca =

Mexican politician (born 1960)

- Born: 14 July 1960 (age 65); Jalisco, Mexico
- Occupation: Politician
- Political party: PAN

Gerardo Amezola Fonseca (born 14 July 1960) is a Mexican politician affiliated with the National Action Party (PAN). In the 2006 general election, he was elected to the Chamber of Deputies to represent Jalisco's 15th district during the 60th session of Congress.
