= Miguel Ángel Monraz Ibarra =

Mexican politician

- Born: 17 July 1973 (age 52); Guadalajara, Jalisco, Mexico
- Occupation: Politician
- Political party: PAN

Miguel Ángel Monraz Ibarra (born 17 July 1973) is a Mexican politician affiliated with the National Action Party (PAN). In the 2006 general election he was elected to the Chamber of Deputies to represent Jalisco's 8th district during the 60th session of Congress.
