= Leobardo Alcalá =

Mexican politician (born 1960)

- Born: 28 August 1960 (age 65); Jalisco, Mexico
- Occupation: Politician
- Political party: PRI

Leobardo Alcalá Padilla (born 28 August 1960) is a Mexican politician affiliated with the Institutional Revolutionary Party (PRI). In the 2012 general election he was elected to the Chamber of Deputies to represent Jalisco's 8th district during the 62nd session of Congress.
