= Gumercindo Castellanos =

Mexican politician (born 1953)

- Born: 21 September 1953 (age 72); Calvillo, Aguascalientes, Mexico
- Occupation: Politician
- Political party: PAN

Gumercindo Castellanos Flores (born 21 September 1953) is a Mexican politician from the National Action Party (PAN).

Castellanos Flores was born in Calvillo, Aguascalientes, in 1953. In 2004–2006 he was the municipal president of Zapotlán del Rey, Jalisco. In 2006–2009 he served as a local deputy during the 58th session of the Congress of Jalisco.

In the 2009 mid-terms, he was elected to the Chamber of Deputies to represent Jalisco's 15th district during the 61st session of Congress.
