= Marisol Urrea Camarena =

Mexican politician (born 1978)

- Born: 28 April 1978 (age 48); Jalisco, Mexico
- Occupation: Politician
- Political party: PAN

Marisol Urrea Camarena (born 28 April 1978) is a Mexican politician affiliated with the National Action Party (PAN). In the 2003 mid-terms she was elected to the Chamber of Deputies to represent Jalisco's 8th district during the 59th session of Congress.
