= Ossiel Niaves López =

Mexican politician

- Born: 2 November 1974 (age 51); Jalisco, Mexico
- Occupation: Politician
- Political party: PRI

Ossiel Omar Niaves López (born 2 November 1974) is a Mexican politician affiliated with the Institutional Revolutionary Party (PRI). In the 2012 general election, he was elected to the Chamber of Deputies to represent Jalisco's 15th district during the 62nd session of Congress.
