= Patricia Retamoza =

Mexican politician (born 1959)

- Born: 31 March 1959 (age 67); Mexico
- Occupation: Politician
- Political party: PRI

Patricia Elena Retamoza Vega (born 31 March 1959) is a Mexican politician affiliated with the Institutional Revolutionary Party (PRI).

In the 2003 mid-terms, she was elected to the Chamber of Deputies to represent Jalisco's 15th district during the 59th session of Congress.

She returned to Congress in the 2012 general election (62nd session) as a plurinominal deputy.
