= Jamay =

- Municipality and town
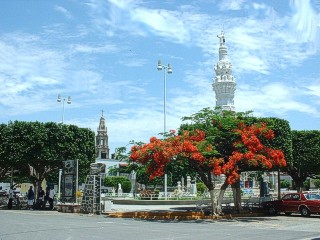
- The main square of Jamay, Jalisco

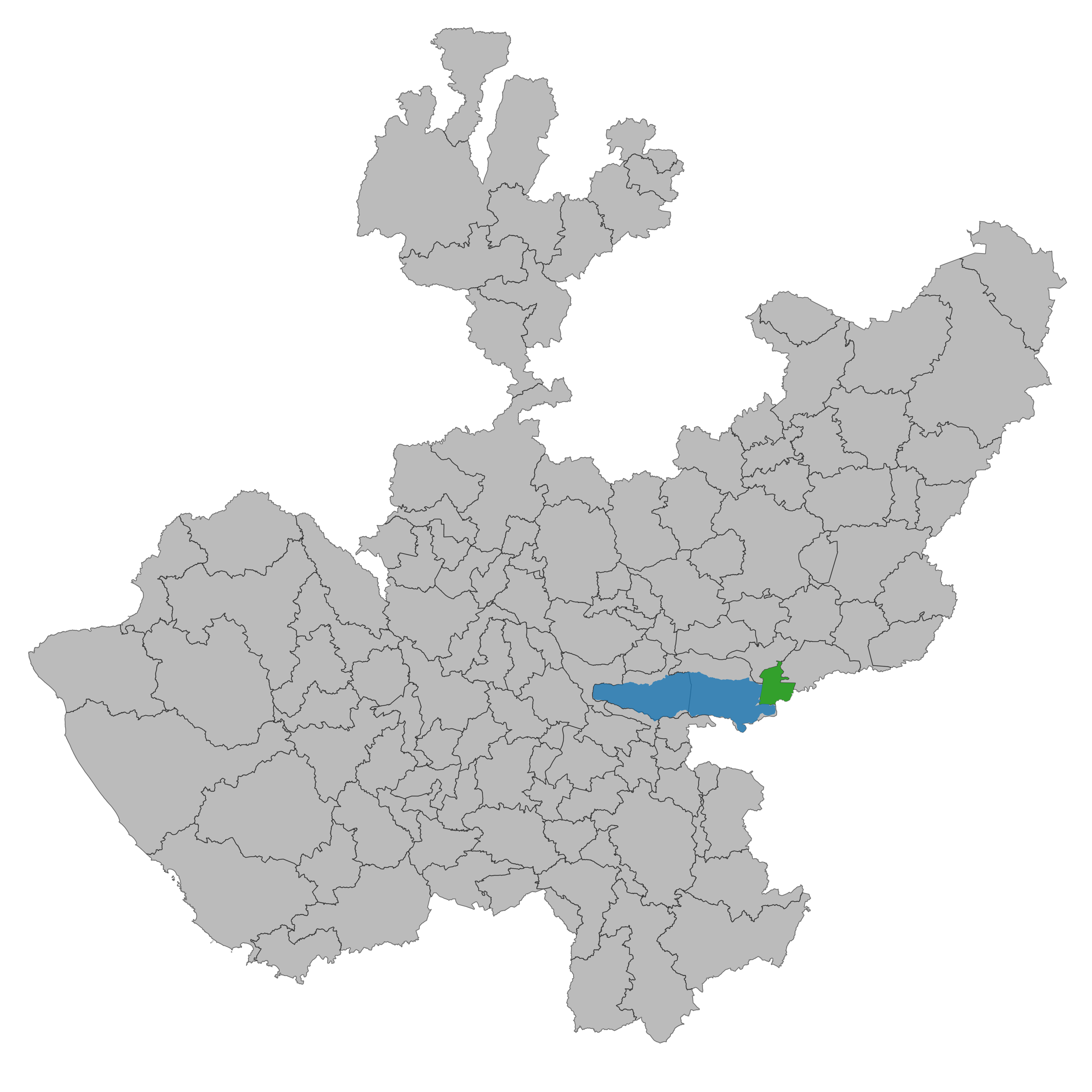
- Location of the municipality in Jalisco

- Location in Mexico
- Coordinates: 20°17′24″N 102°42′36″W
- Country: Mexico
- State: Jalisco

Area
  - Total: 174.49 km^{2} (67.37 sq mi)
  - Town: 3.41 km^{2} (1.32 sq mi)

Population (2020 census)
  - Total: 24,894
  - Density: 142.67/km^{2} (369.51/sq mi)
  - Town: 18,607
  - Town density: 5,460/km^{2} (14,100/sq mi)
- Time zone: UTC-6 (Central Standard Time)

The municipality and town of Jamay is located in the eastern portion of Jalisco, Mexico, at coordinates 20°17.4′N 102°42.6′W, at a height of 1,530 meters (5,020 ft) above sea level. The municipality extends from 20° 25' to 20° 13' N, and from 102° 38' to 102° 44' W.

It covers 174.49 km^{2}, representing 0.14% of the total surface area of the state. The municipality of Jamay adjoins to the north with the municipalities of Ocotlán and La Barca; to the east with the municipality of La Barca; to the south with the municipality of La Barca, the state of Michoacán and the municipality of Ocotlán; to the west with the municipality of Ocotlán and Lake Chapala.

The municipality has 17 towns, including Jamay (the municipal seat), San Miguel de la Paz, San Agustín, Maltaraña and Los Capulines.

Jamay is famous for a monument located in the center of the main square in memory of Pope Pius IX. Jamay is one of the fastest-growing municipalities in Jalisco, hosting pageants every independence day in September and major sporting events.

== Climate ==
Climate data for Jamay (1991–2020 normals, extremes 1970–present)
Month	Jan	Feb	Mar	Apr	May	Jun	Jul	Aug	Sep	Oct	Nov	Dec	Year
Record high °C (°F)	30.5 (86.9)	35 (95)	40 (104)	39.5 (103.1)	39 (102)	39 (102)	39.5 (103.1)	37 (99)	38 (100)	38 (100)	37.5 (99.5)	34 (93)	40 (104)
Mean daily maximum °C (°F)	24.4 (75.9)	26.5 (79.7)	28.7 (83.7)	31.1 (88.0)	32.6 (90.7)	30.5 (86.9)	28.3 (82.9)	28.3 (82.9)	27.8 (82.0)	27.4 (81.3)	26.3 (79.3)	25.0 (77.0)	28.1 (82.6)
Daily mean °C (°F)	15.0 (59.0)	16.8 (62.2)	18.7 (65.7)	20.9 (69.6)	22.8 (73.0)	22.5 (72.5)	21.2 (70.2)	21.1 (70.0)	20.8 (69.4)	19.4 (66.9)	17.2 (63.0)	15.5 (59.9)	19.3 (66.7)
Mean daily minimum °C (°F)	5.6 (42.1)	7.0 (44.6)	8.6 (47.5)	10.6 (51.1)	13.1 (55.6)	14.6 (58.3)	14.1 (57.4)	13.8 (56.8)	13.7 (56.7)	11.3 (52.3)	8.2 (46.8)	6.0 (42.8)	10.6 (51.1)
Record low °C (°F)	−1 (30)	0.6 (33.1)	0 (32)	3.5 (38.3)	5 (41)	1 (34)	5 (41)	5 (41)	1 (34)	3.5 (38.3)	−0.5 (31.1)	−1.5 (29.3)	−1.5 (29.3)
Average precipitation mm (inches)	9.1 (0.36)	13.7 (0.54)	6.4 (0.25)	1.7 (0.07)	21.8 (0.86)	168.5 (6.63)	188.3 (7.41)	168.4 (6.63)	130.7 (5.15)	51.2 (2.02)	12.6 (0.50)	5.3 (0.21)	777.7 (30.62)
Average precipitation days	1.8	1.4	0.9	0.7	2.7	13.7	18.0	16.5	13.8	5.4	2.0	1.3	78.2
Source: Servicio Meteorológico Nacional
