= Ocotlán, Jalisco =

Ocotlán
- Municipality and city
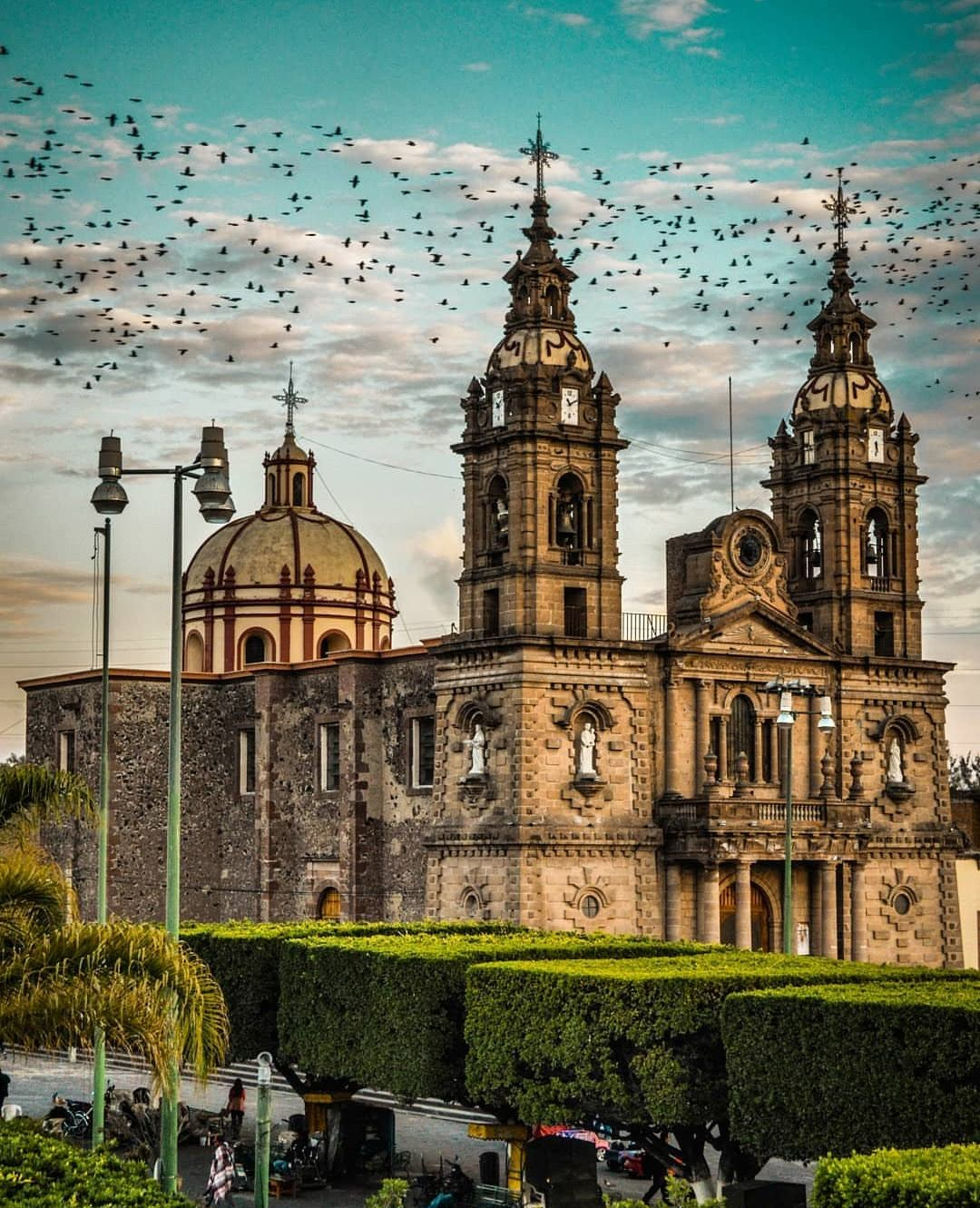

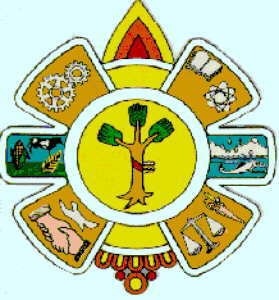
- Coat of arms

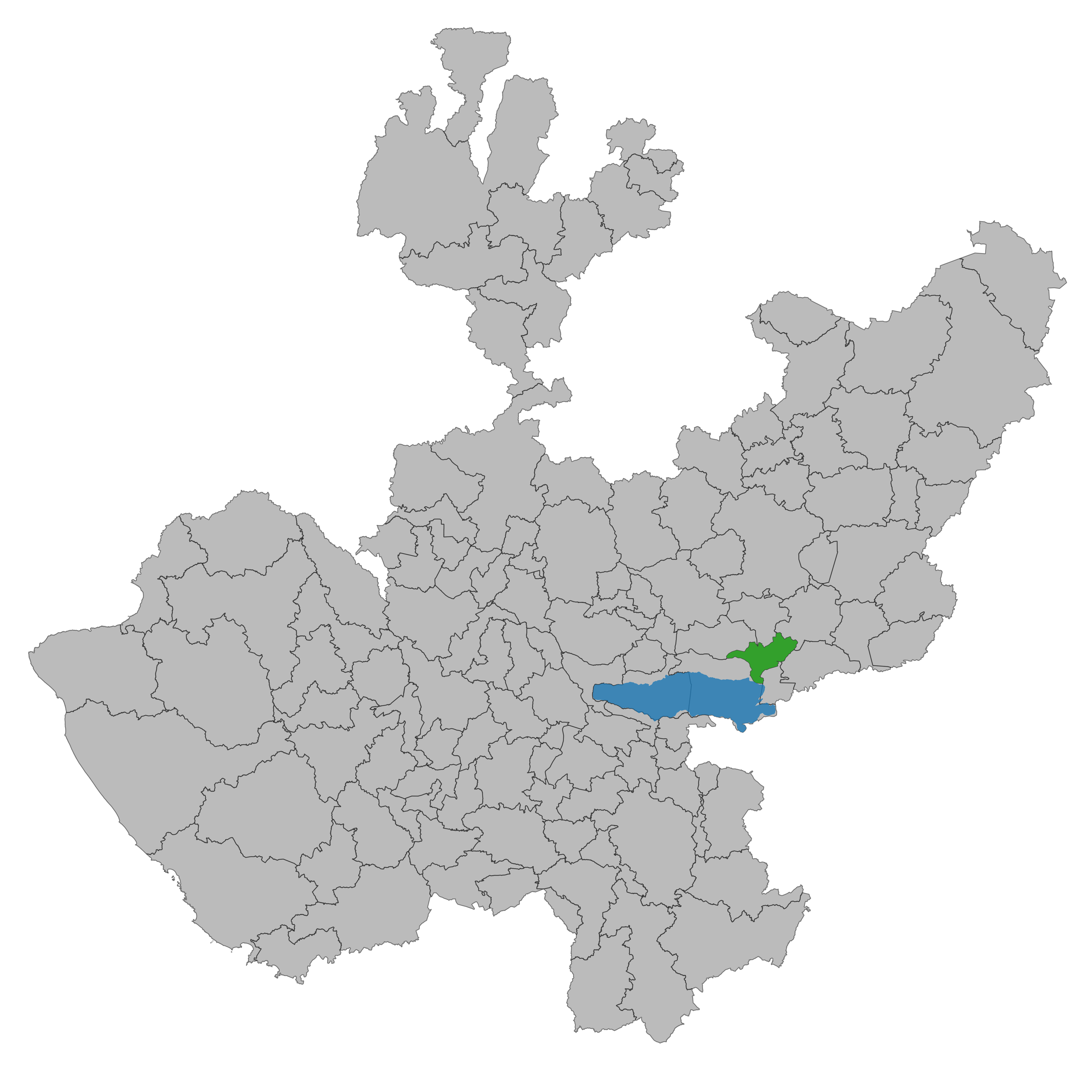
- Location of the municipality in Jalisco

- Location in Mexico
- Coordinates: 20°17′20″N 102°50′20″W
- Country: Mexico
- State: Jalisco

Area
  - City: 19.9 km^{2} (7.7 sq mi)
  - Municipality: 242.7 km^{2} (93.7 sq mi)

Population (2020 census)
  - City: 94,978
  - Density: 4,770/km^{2} (12,400/sq mi)
  - Municipality: 106,050
  - Municipality density: 437.0/km^{2} (1,132/sq mi)
- Time zone: UTC-6 (Central Standard Time)

Ocotlán is a city and municipality in Jalisco, Mexico. Its industry includes furniture production. It is the seat of the Región Ciénega.

== Etymology ==
Ocotlán means "near the pines" or "place of the ocote (pines)". Ocote is from Nahuatl ocōtl, Pinus montezumae, a species of pine.

== History ==
Ocotlán was founded in 1530. Two main cathedrals line the plaza. One is the church named La Purísima ("The Most Pure"), which is one of the oldest buildings in Jalisco. The altar is dipped in gold. The other cathedral, more recent than La Purísima, was built in the late 1800s and dedicated to Nuestro Señor de Misericordia (Our Merciful Lord), which honors a vision of Christ seen after an extremely destructive earthquake.

The current municipal president is Deysi Nallely Ángel Hernández.

== Appearance of Christ ==
On October 2, 1847 at approximately 7:30 a.m., a large and powerful earthquake destroyed most of the city, including the original church. The following day on Sunday, 2,000 people attending a Mass outside of the destroyed church claimed to have seen a vision of the crucifix in the sky by more, which lasted approximately 30 minutes. On September 29, 1911, José de Jesús Ortiz y Rodríguez, who was the Archbishop of Guadalajara at the time, signed a legal document approving the appearance of Jesus Christ as a true and given fact. The event became known as the "Miracle of Ocotlán". Festivities then began in 1912 in honor of El Señor de la Misericordia (Lord of Mercy). Festivities last 13 days, from Sep 20 to October 3.

It has become a tradition passed from generation to generation, with celebrations taking place in Ocotlán, and in different parts of the United States by those who have migrated from Ocotlán.

== Geography ==
Ocotlán borders Poncitlán and Tototlán and is only 50 minutes drive east-southeast from the city of Guadalajara. It is on the northeast end of Lake Chapala, Mexico's largest lake. As of 2010, the city had a population of 92,967. The municipality of Ocotlán, which has an area of 247.7 km^{2} (95.64 sq mi), as of 2020 had a population of 184,603 inhabitants, of which 50.9% were women and 49.1% were men. That is an increase of 12.9% since 2010. The proper gentilic for the inhabitants is Ocotlense. The altitude of the city is 5020 ft, and the time zone is UTC-6.

=== Climate ===
Generally, the weather in Ocotlán, Jalisco is warm all year round, with warmer daytime temperatures and cooler evening temperatures. Hottest months of the year are April and May, May reaching its peak with an average high of 89 °F and low of 60 °F. Cooler months are November to February. January is the coldest month of the year, with an average high of 76 °F and an average evening low of 44 °F. Despite the drop in temperatures from the morning to the evening, the humidity remains the same. So a humid day is followed by a humid night.

== Businesses ==
Businesses in Ocotlán include Nestlé, Celanese, Forrajes El Nogal, Maderas primas de occidente, Triplay y Aglomerados, Fábrica de Muebles La Cibeles and many other furniture factories, like EMMAN, an MDF manufacturer. Celanese closed its acetate flake plant, built in 1947, on October 31 2019, eliminating 200 jobs.

== Architecture ==
One of the most important buildings is the new library and media center, recently opened to the public in 2000, and operated by the University of Guadalajara. The modern building is inspired by the lineal constructions of the university center. It features a big and open lobby of multiple heights in which the main elements of the visual composition of the space are the books themselves. The building was designed by the young architecture firm LeAP, based in Guadalajara. It has been published and exhibited locally and internationally.

== Culture ==
Jalisco is a popular tourist destination with many cultural traditions such as mariachis, tequila, Ballet Folklórico, the Mexican Hat Dance, charros, sombreros, and much more. Mariachi ensemble Vargas de Tecalitlán is one of the most important in the history of mariachi music; the group was founded in 1898 by Gaspar Vargas in Tecalitlán, Jalisco.

=== Cuisine ===
Ocotlán is known for their authentic flavorful birria. It is a spicy stew which is traditionally made from goat meat but can also be made from beef. Many travel to the city just for its birria, and others have brought the dish to other countries, such as the United States.

=== Organized crime ===
On March 20 2015 around 9:15 p.m. the town suffered from one of its most deadliest shootings. Seven vehicles carrying Mexico paramilitary gendarmerie officers were sent to Ocotlán because they had received a report of an attack on municipal police. They were ambushed by Mexican drug gang/cartel with a goal to get the Gendarmerie out of their territories. In August 2014, President Enrique Peña Nieto had launched a strong 5,000 Gendarmerie unit to combat economic crime. The cartel's goal is to have their territories free of federal police so they can continue with illicit economic activity, extortion, and street taxation. The attack resulted in the death of five officers, three suspects, two innocent bystanders, and 8 wounded officers. Law enforcement has been ambushed previously, including in other surrounding cities and states, but never so many in a single attack.

== Notable people ==
- Carlos Salcido (footballer)
- Miguel Basulto (footballer)
- Jonny Magallón (footballer)
- Ismael Íñiguez (footballer)
- Flavio Santos (footballer)
- Oscar Macías (footballer)
- Alejandra Muñoz (Entrepreneur)

== Sister cities ==
- Corona, United States
- Olathe, United States
- Oxnard, United States
- Stone Park, United States
