= Poncitlán =

- Municipality and city
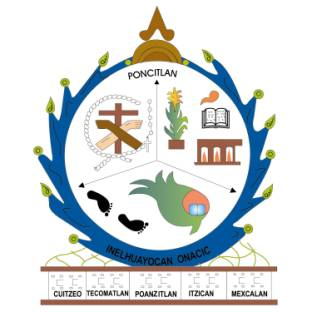
- Coat of arms

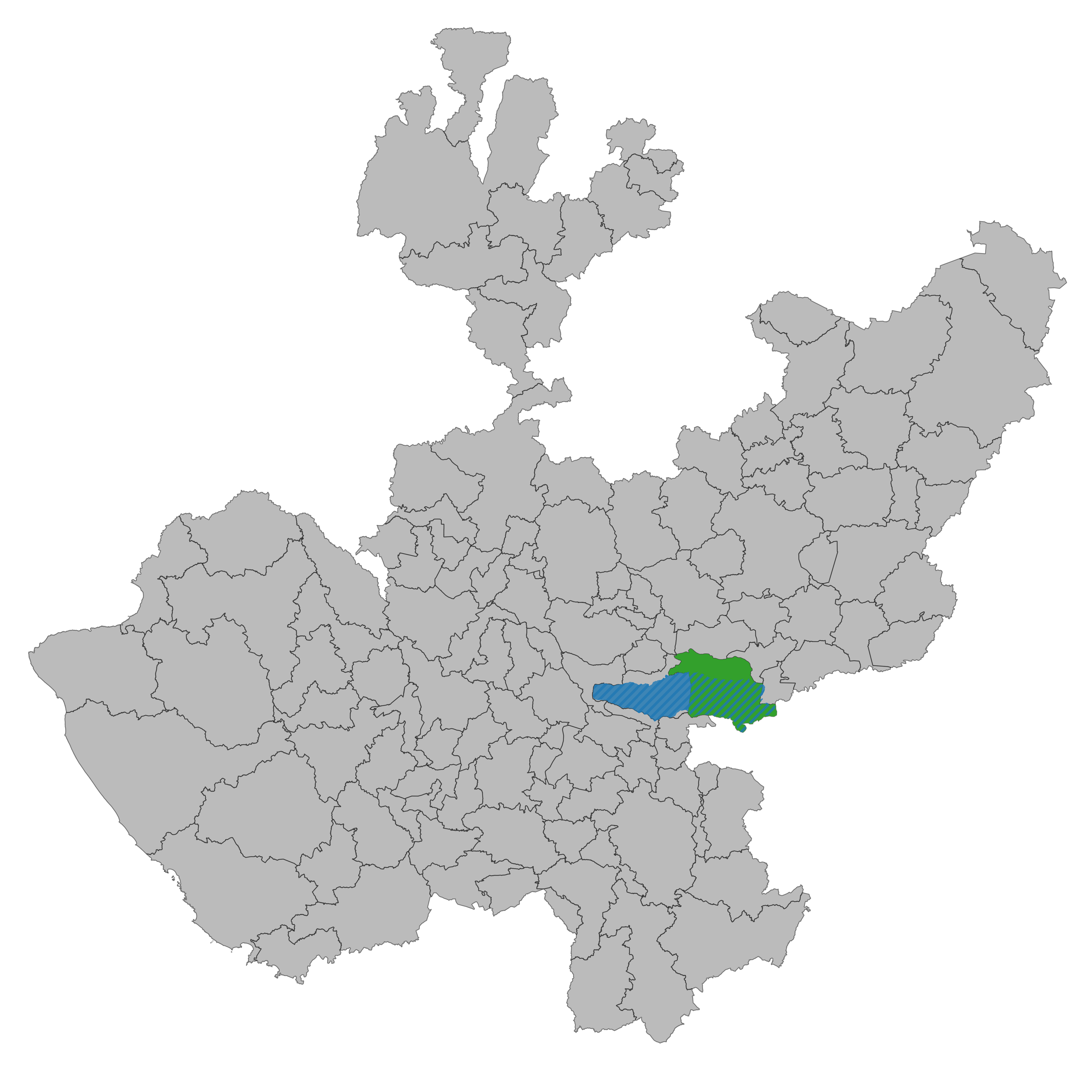
- Location of the municipality in Jalisco

- Location in Mexico
- Coordinates: 20°18′N 102°16′W
- Country: Mexico
- State: Jalisco

Area
  - Total: 672.31 km^{2} (259.58 sq mi)

Population (2005)
  - Total: 43,817
- Time zone: UTC-6 (Central Standard Time)

Poncitlán is a town and municipality, in Jalisco in central-western Mexico. The municipality covers an area of 672.31 km^{2}.

As of 2005, the municipality had a total population of 43,817.

== Place Names ==
Poncitlán means "place of cilacayotes", "next to the shore chilares" or "place of God Ponze." It is located west of the Ocotlán municipality.

== Sister cities ==
- Palmdale, California, United States (1998)
