= Tototlán =

- Municipality and town
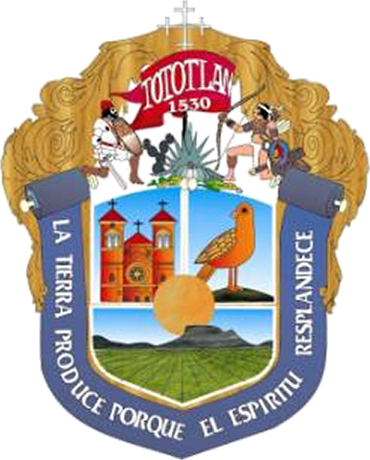
- Coat of arms

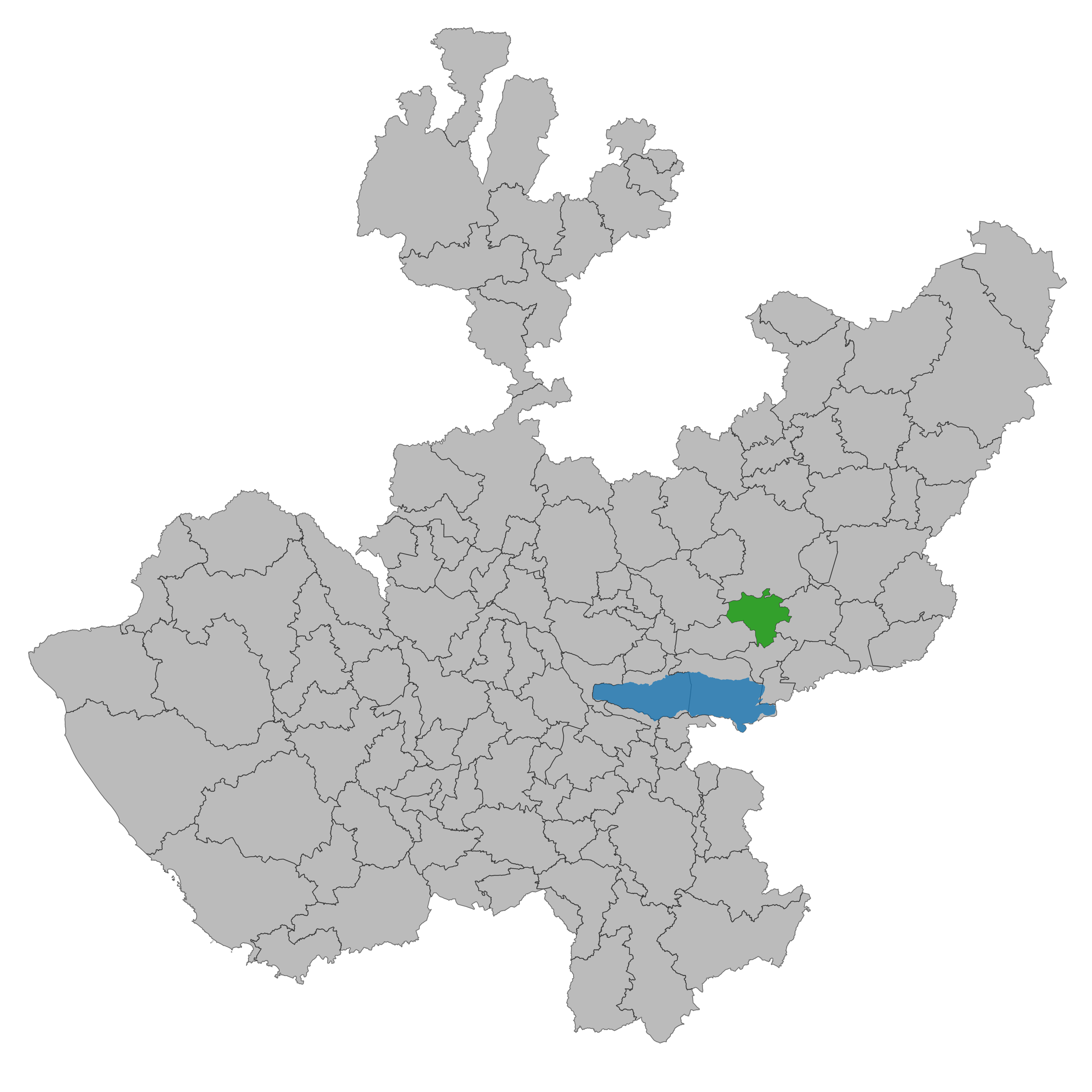
- Location of the municipality in Jalisco

- Location in Mexico
- Coordinates: 20°05′N 102°39′W
- Country: Mexico
- State: Jalisco

Area
  - Total: 336.6 km^{2} (130.0 sq mi)
  - Town: 3.3 km^{2} (1.3 sq mi)

Population (2020 census)
  - Total: 23,573
  - Density: 70.03/km^{2} (181.4/sq mi)
  - Town: 13,809
  - Town density: 4,200/km^{2} (11,000/sq mi)
- Time zone: UTC-6 (Central Standard Time)
- municipal ranches of las cuestas are located here.

Tototlán is a town and municipality in Jalisco in central-western Mexico. The municipality covers an area of 336.6 km^{2}. Some notable people from Tototlán, Jalisco are Omar Esparza (plays for C.D Guadalajara) and Javier Hernández Gutiérrez (retired soccer player).

Tototlán has a saint called ST. Sabás Reyes Salazar, he was tied to a pillar and murdered, that pillar is now part of a big church they built. A temple called "EL CERRITO DE LA CRUZ" was built on a hill, people go there to pray. Besides the church, there is a place called "LA PLAZA".

As of 2005, the municipality had a total population of 19,710.
