= La Barca Municipality =

La Barca
- Municipality and town
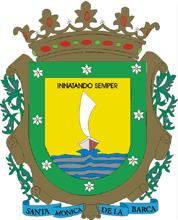
- Coat of arms

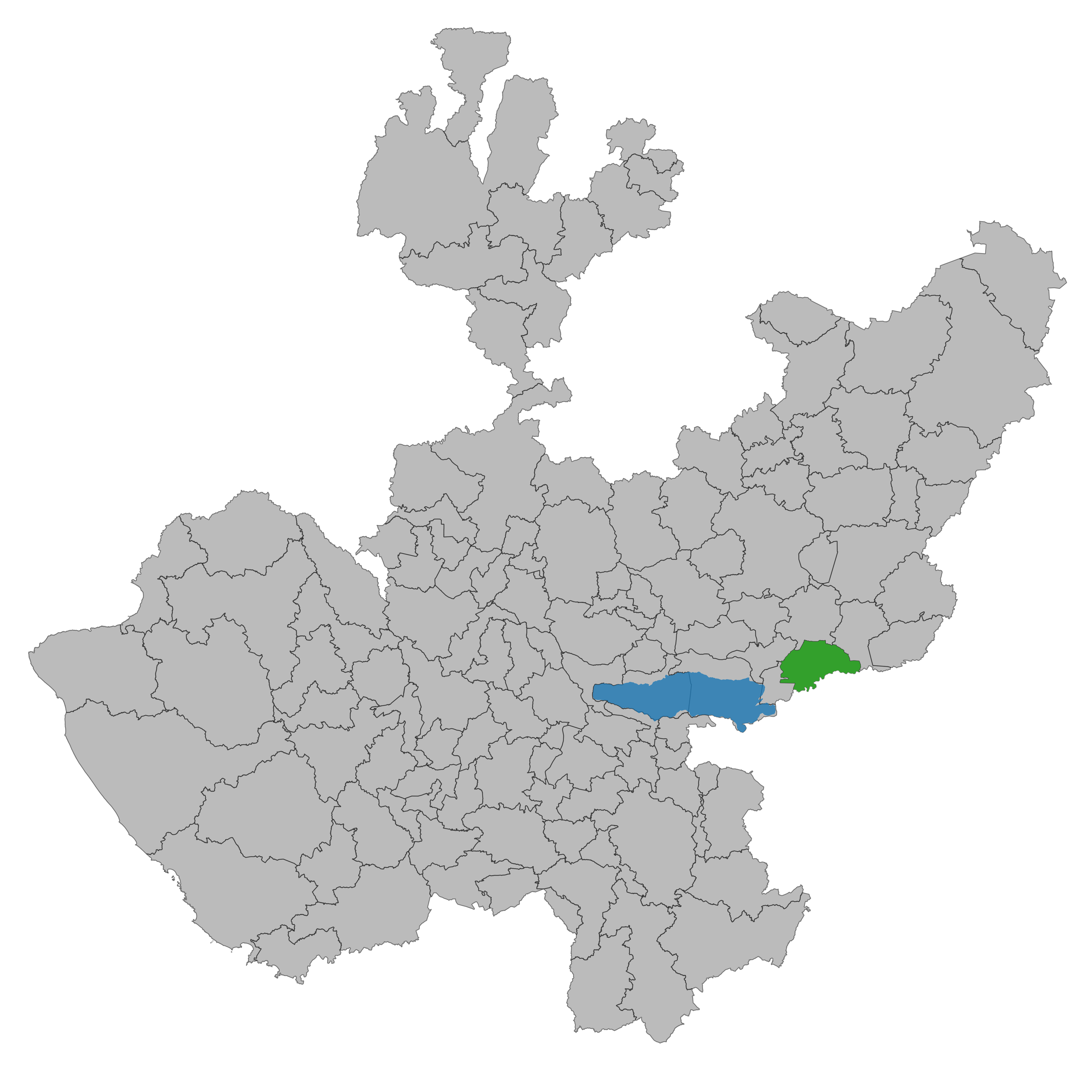
- Location of the municipality in Jalisco

- Location in Mexico
- Coordinates: 20°17′N 102°34′W
- Country: Mexico
- State: Jalisco

Area
  - Municipality: 418.2 km^{2} (161.5 sq mi)
  - Town: 11.83 km^{2} (4.57 sq mi)

Population (2020 census)
  - Municipality: 67,937
  - Density: 162.5/km^{2} (420.7/sq mi)
  - town: 38,780
  - town density: 3,278/km^{2} (8,490/sq mi)
- =
- Time zone: UTC-6 (Central Standard Time)

La Barca is a city and municipality in the Mexican state of Jalisco. It is one of twenty five municipalities that make up the state of Jalisco. It's located in the Ciénega region, and encompasses 37,948 kilometers squared. The 2020 Census counted 67,937 inhabitants.

It is located on the north banks of the Lerma River, on the state border between Jalisco and Michoacán.

During pre-hispanic times, the region carried the name Chicunahutenco, meaning the edge of the nine waters. Being located on the road to Guadalajara, travelers during colonial times had to cross a ferry at this site, in order to cross the Lerma River. In order to accommodate travelers, the establishment of a settlement was thus decreed by the Spanish authorities.

== Notable people ==
- Alfonso Ramírez (1919–2004), professional baseball pitcher
- Alfredo Talavera (born 1982), professional football goalkeeper

== Municipality ==
There are 76 localities in the municipality of La Barca, which include the town of La Barca, San José Casas Caídas, El Carmen, El Gobernador, Portezuelo, Villa de García Márquez, San Francisco de Rivas, and more.
