= Evelia Sandoval Urbán =

Mexican politician (born 1964)

Senator of the Congress of the Union for Zacatecas
- Incumbent
- Assumed office 4 March 2021 Serving with María Soledad Luévano Cantú and José Narro Céspedes
- Preceded by: Claudia Anaya Mota

Federal deputy of the Congress of the Union for Jalisco's 13th district
- In office 1 September 2003 – 31 August 2006

Personal details
- Born: 20 November 1964 (age 60); Jamiltepec, Oaxaca, Mexico
- Political party: PANAL
- Occupation: Politician

Evelia Sandoval Urbán (born 20 November 1964) is a Mexican politician affiliated with the New Alliance Party (PANAL). In the 2003 mid-terms she was elected to the Chamber of Deputies to represent Jalisco's 13th district for the Institutional Revolutionary Party (PRI) but, after 16 March 2006, sat as an independent.

She was an alternate senator for Zacatecas in the 64th and 65th sessions of Congress (standing in for Claudia Edith Anaya Mota of the PRI during her absences).
