= Claudia Anaya Mota =

Mexican politician

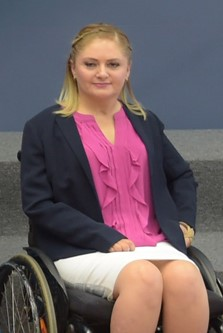

Senator of the Congress of the Union for Zacatecas
- Incumbent
- Assumed office 1 September 2021 Serving with María Soledad Luévano Cantú and José Narro Céspedes
- Preceded by: Evelia Sandoval Urbán
- In office 1 September 2018 – 4 March 2021
- Preceded by: Héctor Adrián Menchaca Medrano
- Succeeded by: Evelia Sandoval Urbán

Personal details
- Born: 6 June 1979 (age 45); Zacatecas, Zacatecas, Mexico
- Political party: PRD (2005–2013); Institutional Revolutionary Party (2013–present)
- Occupation: Politician

Claudia Edith Anaya Mota (born 6 June 1979) is a Mexican politician from the city of Zacatecas. She is a member of the Institutional Revolutionary Party (PRI) since 2013, after formerly belonging to the Party of the Democratic Revolution (PRD).

In the 2009 mid-terms she was elected to the Chamber of Deputies in the second electoral region on the PRD ticket. She was re-elected to Congress for Zacatecas's third district as a member of the PRI in 2015.

Anaya Mota was elected to the Senate for Zacatecas in the 2018 general election and ran unsuccessfully for governor of Zacatecas in the 2021 election. She was re-elected to the Senate as Zacatecas's third senator in the 2024 election for the Fuerza y Corazón por México coalition (PAN/PRI/PRD).
