= Marco Antonio Barba Mariscal =

Mexican politician (born 1970)

- Born: 24 May 1970 (age 55); Guadalajara, Jalisco, Mexico
- Occupation: Politician
- Political party: PRI

Marco Antonio Barba Mariscal (born 24 May 1970) is a Mexican politician affiliated with the Institutional Revolutionary Party (PRI). In the 2012 general election he was elected to the Chamber of Deputies to represent Jalisco's 13th district during the 62nd session of Congress.
