= José de Jesús Solano Muñoz =

Mexican politician (born 1969)

- Born: 6 May 1969 (age 57); Jalisco, Mexico
- Occupation: Politician
- Political party: PAN

José de Jesús Solano Muñoz (born 6 May 1969) is a Mexican politician affiliated with the National Action Party (PAN). In the 2006 general election he was elected to the Chamber of Deputies to represent Jalisco's 13th district during the 60th session of Congress.
