= Ana Estela Durán Rico =

Mexican politician (born 1955)

- Born: 5 August 1955 (age 70); Jalisco, Mexico
- Occupation: Politician
- Political party: PRI

Ana Estela Durán Rico (born 5 August 1955) is a Mexican politician from the Institutional Revolutionary Party (PRI). In the 2009 mid-terms she was elected to the Chamber of Deputies to represent Jalisco's 13th district during the 61st session of Congress.
