= 13th federal electoral district of Jalisco =

Federal electoral district of Mexico

Jalisco's 13th
- Electoral district of the Chamber of Deputies of Mexico

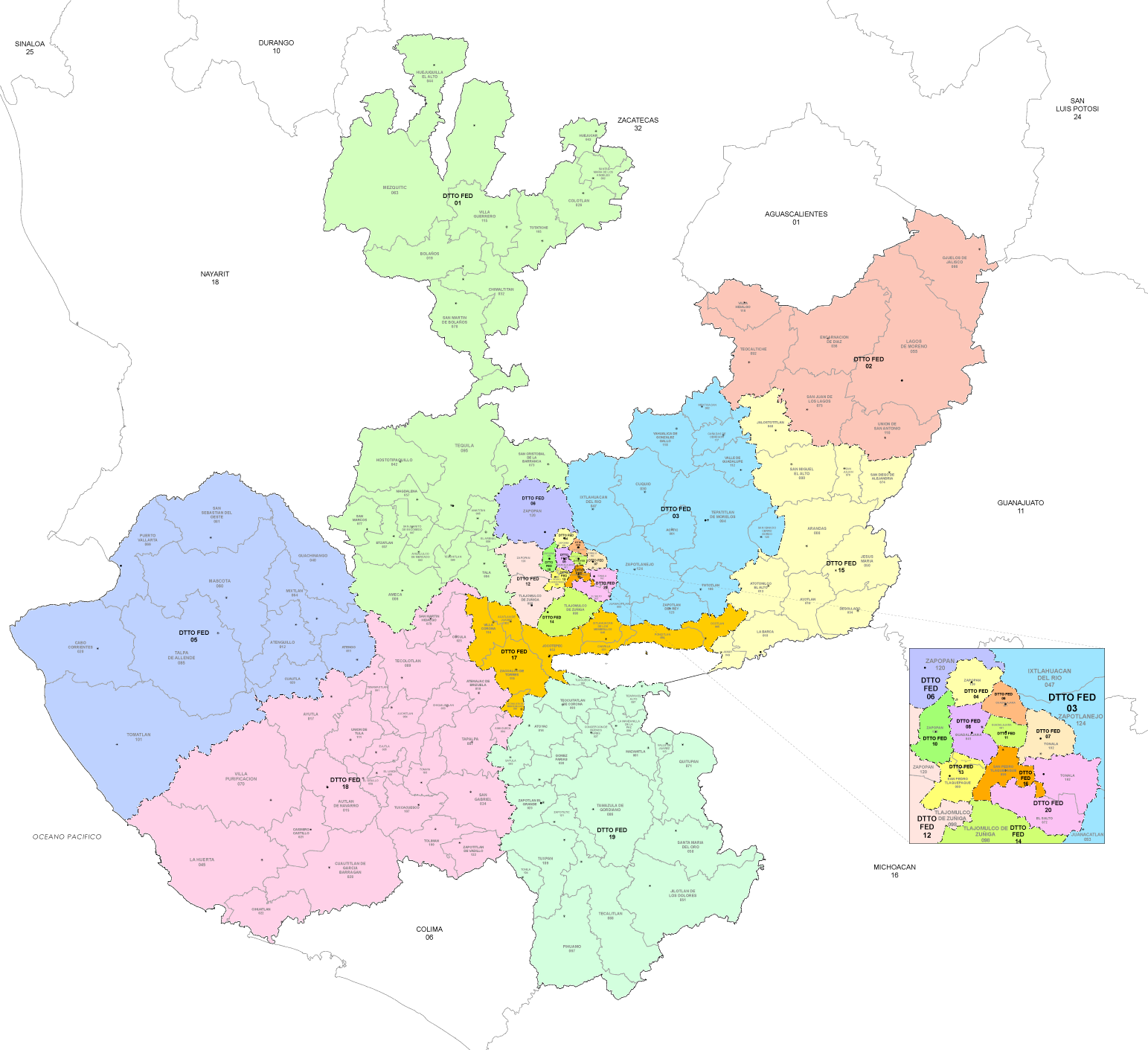
- 13th district

Incumbent
- Member: José Luis Sánchez
- Party: ▌Labour Party
- Congress: 66th (2024–2027)

District
- State: Jalisco
- Head town: Santa María Tequepexpan, Tlaquepaque
- Coordinates: 20°36′N 103°24′W
- Covers: Tlaquepaque (part), Guadalajara (part)
- PR region: First
- Precincts: 158
- Population: 420,059 (2020 census)

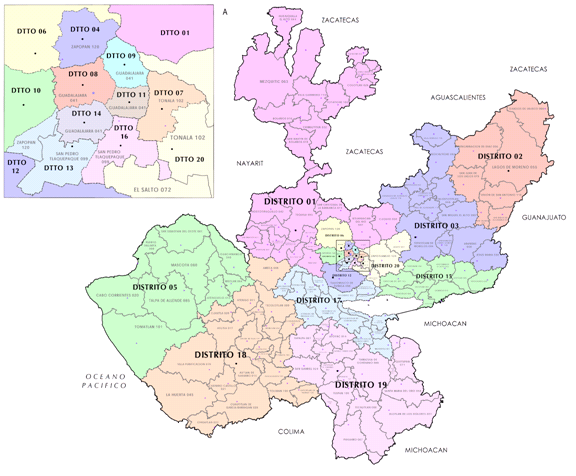
Jalisco's districts in 2017–2022

The 13th federal electoral district of Jalisco (Spanish: Distrito electoral federal 13 de Jalisco) is one of the 300 electoral districts into which Mexico is divided for elections to the federal Chamber of Deputies and one of 20 such districts in the state of Jalisco.

It elects one deputy to the lower house of Congress for each three-year legislative session by means of the first-past-the-post system. Votes cast in the district also count towards the calculation of proportional representation ("plurinominal") deputies elected from the first region.

The current member for the district, elected in the 2024 general election, is José Luis Sánchez González of the Labour Party (PT).

== District territory ==
Under the 2023 districting plan adopted by the National Electoral Institute (INE), which is to be used for the 2024, 2027 and 2030 federal elections, Jalisco's 13th district is located in the Guadalajara Metropolitan Area and comprises 158 electoral precincts (secciones electorales) across portions of two of the state's 125 municipalities:

- Tlaquepaque (85 precincts in the west) and Guadalajara (73 precincts in the south). (Note: The 8th, 9th and 11th districts cover the remainder of Guadalajara, and the rest of Tlaquepaque (125 precincts) is assigned to the 16th district.)

The head town (cabecera distrital), where results from individual polling stations are gathered together and tallied, is the city of Santa María Tequepexpan in the municipality of Tlaquepaque. The district reported a population of 420,059 in the 2020 census.

== Previous districting schemes ==
Evolution of electoral district numbers
	1974	1978	1996	2005	2017	2023
Jalisco	13	20	19	19	20	20
Chamber of Deputies	196	300				

2017–2022

Jalisco regained its 20th congressional seat in the 2017 redistricting process. The 13th district's head town was at Tlaquepaque and it covered 84 precincts in that municipality and 54 in neighbouring Zapopan.

2005–2017

Under the 2005 plan, Jalisco had 19 districts. This district covered 231 precincts in the centre and south-east of the municipality of Guadalajara.

1996–2005

In the 1996 scheme, under which Jalisco lost a single-member seat, the district had its head town at Guadalajara and it comprised 183 precincts in the south-east of that municipality.

1978–1996

The districting scheme in force from 1978 to 1996 was the result of the 1977 electoral reforms, which increased the number of single-member seats in the Chamber of Deputies from 196 to 300. Under that plan, Jalisco's seat allocation rose from 13 to 20. The 13th district's head town was at Guadalajara and it covered portions of the city's Juárez and Libertad sectors.

== Deputies returned to Congress ==
(Mexico) National parties
- Current
- PAN
- PRI
- PT
- PVEM
- MC
- Morena
- PAZ
- Somos
- Defunct or local only
- PLM
- PNR
- PRM
- PNM
- PP
- PPS
- PARM
- PFCRN
- CON
- PANAL
- PSD
- PES
- PES
- PRD

Jalisco's 13th district
Election	Deputy	Party	Term	Legislature
1916	Ignacio Ramos Praslow		1916–1917	Constituent Congress of Querétaro
...
1973	Carlos Rivera Aceves	Institutional Revolutionary Party	1973–1976	49th Congress
1976	Jesús Alberto Mora López	Institutional Revolutionary Party	1976–1979	50th Congress
1979	Juan Delgado Navarro	Institutional Revolutionary Party	1979–1982	51st Congress
1982	Oralia Viramontes de la Mora	Institutional Revolutionary Party	1982–1985	52nd Congress
1985	Francisco Javier Morales Aceves	Institutional Revolutionary Party	1985–1988	53rd Congress
1988	César Coll Carabias	Institutional Revolutionary Party	1988–1991	54th Congress
1991	Juan José Bañuelos Guardado	Institutional Revolutionary Party	1991–1994	55th Congress
1994	José de Jesús Preciado Bermejo	Institutional Revolutionary Party	1994–1997	56th Congress
1997	Carlos Íñiguez Cervantes	National Action Party (Mexico)	1997–2000	57th Congress
2000	Rodolfo Guadalupe Ocampo Velázquez	National Action Party (Mexico)	2000–2003	58th Congress
2003	Evelia Sandoval Urbán (Note: Originally elected for the PRI, Sandoval Urbán sat as an independent after 16 March 2006.)	Institutional Revolutionary Party Independent politician	2003–2006	59th Congress
2006	José de Jesús Solano Muñoz	National Action Party (Mexico)	2006–2009	60th Congress
2009	Ana Estela Durán Rico	Institutional Revolutionary Party	2009–2012	61st Congress
2012	Marco Antonio Barba Mariscal	Institutional Revolutionary Party	2012–2015	62nd Congress
2015	Rosa Alba Ramírez Nachis	Citizens' Movement (Mexico)	2015–2018	63rd Congress
2018	Lourdes Celenia Contreras González	Citizens' Movement (Mexico)	2018–2021	64th Congress
2021	Sergio Barrera Sepúlveda	Citizens' Movement (Mexico)	2021–2024	65th Congress
2024	José Luis Sánchez González	Labour Party (Mexico)	2024–2027	66th Congress

== Presidential elections ==
Jalisco's 13th district
Election	District won by	Party or coalition	%
2018	Andrés Manuel López Obrador	Juntos Haremos Historia	39.3672
2024	Claudia Sheinbaum Pardo	Sigamos Haciendo Historia	48.5120
