= Coat of arms of Zacatecas =

Coat of Arms of Zacatecas

The Coat of arms of Zacatecas was granted to the city of Zacatecas —and later adopted by the municipality and state of the same name— on June 20, 1588, by King Philip II, through a Royal Decree.

It depicts the Cerro de La Bufa, a silver cross, an image of Our Lady of Zacatecas, the Sun, the Moon and a number crowned in gold. The four characters dressed in black present on the coat of arms are Juan de Tolosa, Baltasar Temiño de Bañuelos, Diego de Ibarra and Captain Cristóbal de Oñate, the first Spanish discoverers of the hill and rock.

== Symbolism ==
According to the original royal decree, it has the shape of a Spanish shield. In its only field, there is a prominent elevation that represents the emblematic hill of La Bufa, at the foot of which the city was founded on January 20, 1548, as a result of the discovery of the rich silver mines.

On the most prominent part of the hill there is a silver cross, and in the center, an image of the Virgin Mary, since the silver mines that would later lead to the foundation of the city were discovered on September 8, 1846, the day on which the Catholic Church celebrates the birth of the Virgin Mary; below, the royal monogram of Philip II, the king who granted the coat of arms.

Image of the original banner granted by Philip II At the two upper ends of the shield are the sun and the moon, to the right and left of the shield, respectively, on blue.

On the slope of the hill there are four portraits of people in the silver field in memory of Juan de Tolosa, Diego de Ibarra, Baltasar Temiño de Bañuelos and Captain Cristóbal de Oñate, the main founders, miners and settlers of Zacatecas; below them appears the motto Labor Vincit Omnia which means "work conquers all".

On the border, five bundles of arrows and interspersed with another five bows, which are the weapons used by the indigenous populations of the place.

=== Historical coats ===
The symbol is used by all successive regimes in New Spain, in different forms.

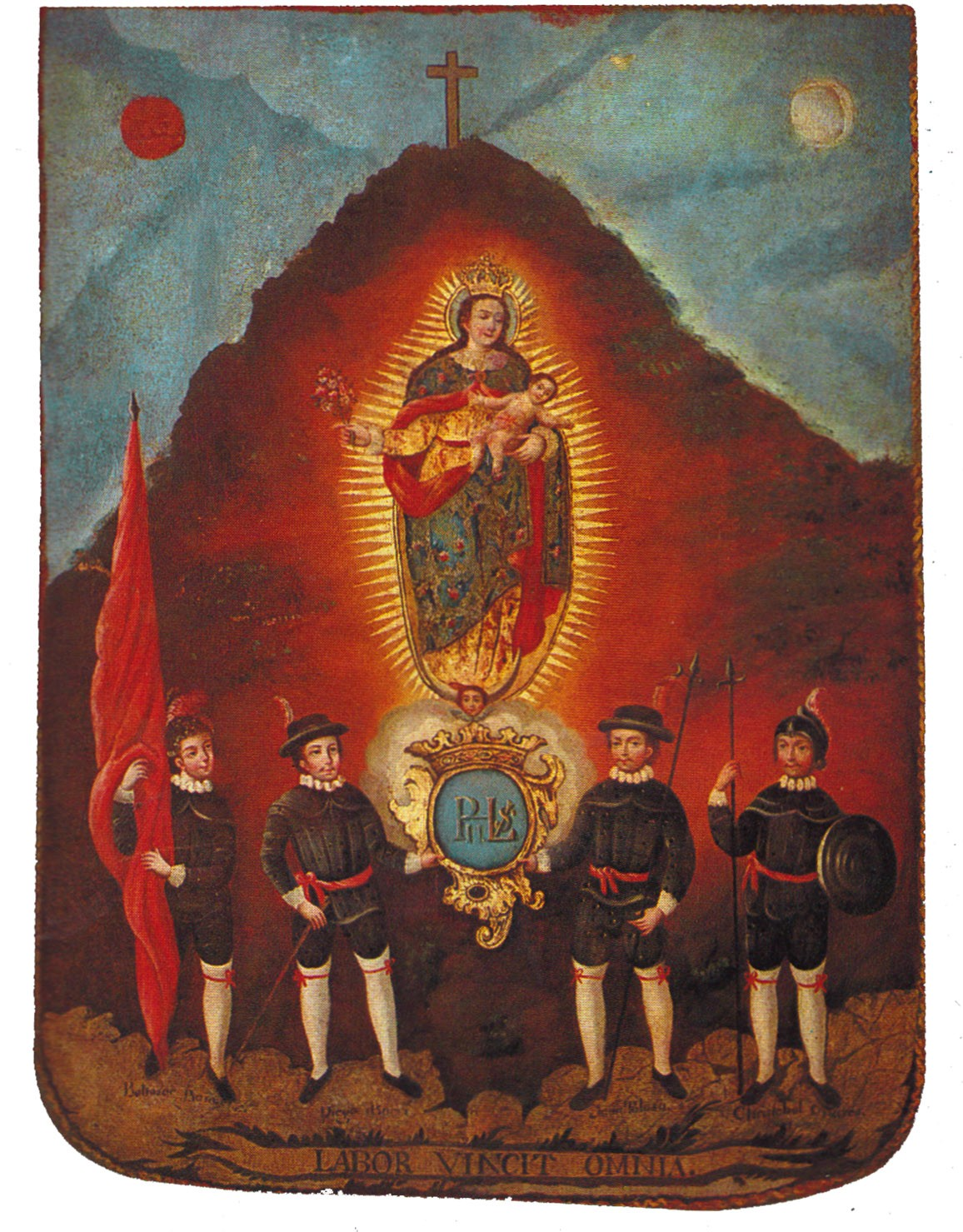
Coat of arms from 1712 to 1800.

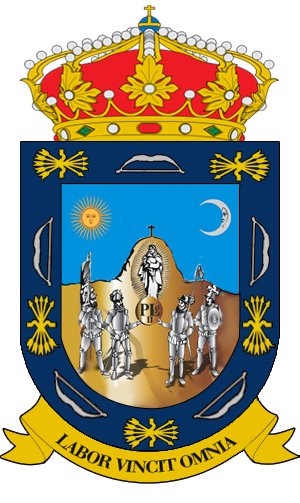
Coat of arms from 1812 to 1979.

== See also ==
- Zacatecas
- Coat of arms of Mexico
