= José Narro Céspedes =

Mexican politician

Senator of the Congress of the Union from Zacatecas
- Incumbent
- Assumed office 1 September 2018 Serving with María Soledad Luévano Cantú and Claudia Edith Anaya Mota
- Preceded by: Héctor Adrián Menchaca Medrano

Personal details
- Born: 17 January 1959 (age 67) Ciudad Mante, Tamaulipas, Mexico
- Party: PT (1990–2009); PRD (2009–2015); MORENA (2017–present)
- Education: UAM
- Occupation: Politician

José Narro Céspedes (born 17 January 1959) is a Mexican politician currently affiliated with the National Regeneration Movement and serving as a senator to the LXIV Legislature of the Mexican Congress from the state of Zacatecas. As a member of the Party of the Democratic Revolution and Labor Party, he was previously a federal deputy in the LVI, LVIII and LXI Legislatures. At the state level, he served in both the Congress of Zacatecas and the Legislative Assembly of the Federal District in the 1990s.
