= Zacatecas =

State of Mexico

- State
- Free and Sovereign State of Zacatecas; Estado Libre y Soberano de Zacatecas (Spanish)
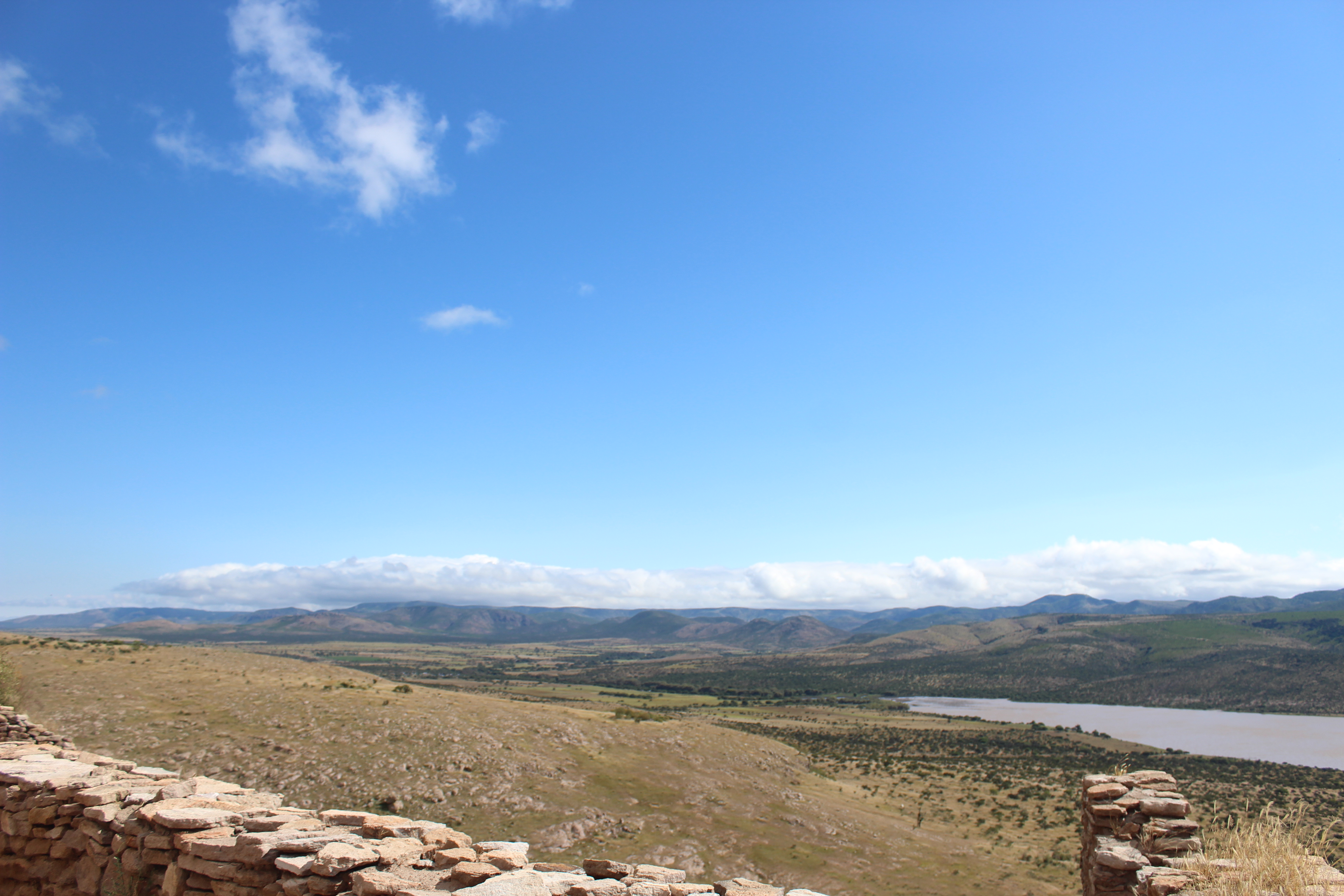
- La Quemada archaeological zone

- Coat of arms
- Motto: Labor Vincit Omnia (Work Conquers All)
- Anthem: Marcha de Zacatecas (English: "Zacatecas March")
- State of Zacatecas within Mexico
- Coordinates: 23°18′N 102°42′W
- Country: Mexico
- Capital: Zacatecas
- Largest city: Guadalupe
- Largest municipality: Fresnillo
- Municipalities: 58
- Admission: December 23, 1823
- Order: 10th

Government
  - Governor: David Monreal Ávila
  - Senators: María Soledad Luévano Cantú; José Narro Céspedes; Claudia Edith Anaya Mota
  - Deputies: Federal deputies: • Bennelly Hernández Ruedas (1st); • Miguel Ángel Varela Pinedo (2nd); • Alfredo Femat Bañuelos (3rd); • Carolina Dávila Ramírez (4th)

Area
  - Total: 75,284 km^{2} (29,067 sq mi)
- Ranked 8th
- Highest elevation (Cerro los Pelones): 3,175 m (10,417 ft)

Population (2020)
  - Total: 1,622,138
  - Rank: 25th
  - Density: 21.547/km^{2} (55.806/sq mi)
  - Rank: 25th
- Demonym: Zacatecan

GDP (2022)
  - Total: MXN 269 billion (US$14.4 billion)
  - Per capita: US$8,184
- Time zone: UTC−06:00 (Zona Centro)
- Postal codes: 98, 99
- Area code: Area codes 1 and 2: • 346; • 433; • 437; • 457; • 458; • 463; • 467; • 478; • 492; • 493; • 494; • 496; • 498; • 499
- ISO 3166 code: MX-ZAC
- HDI: ▲0.777 high Ranked 25th of 32
- Website: Official Web Site

Zacatecas, (Note: Spanish: [sakaˈtekas]) officially the Free and Sovereign State of Zacatecas, (Note: Spanish: Estado Libre y Soberano de Zacatecas) is one of the 31 states of Mexico. It is divided into 58 municipalities and its capital city is Zacatecas.

It is located in north-central Mexico and is bordered by the states of Durango to the west, Coahuila to the north, Nuevo León to the northeast, San Luis Potosí to the east, Guanajuato to the southeast, Jalisco and Aguascalientes to the south, and Nayarit to the southwest. The state is best known for its rich deposits of silver and other minerals, its colonial architecture and its importance during the Mexican Revolution. Its main economic activities are mining, agriculture and tourism.

== Geography ==
Zacatecas is located in the center-north of Mexico, and covers an area of 75,284 km^{2}, the tenth-largest state in the country. It borders the states of Nayarit, Jalisco,Guanajuato,Aguascalientes, San Luis Potosí, Coahuila and Durango and is divided into 58 municipalities and 4,882 towns, cities and other communities.

The state has an average altitude of 2230 meters above sea level, with the capital at 2,496 masl. The state has three main geographical regions, the Sierra Madre Occidental in the west, the Mexican Plateau and the Sierra Madre Oriental. Most of it is in the Sierra Madre Occidental with highly rugged peaks of over 2,500 meters above sea level. The mountains of the southeast and northeast are lower but there are large valleys such as the Juchipila and Tlaltenango. Most of the territory has only small mesas and other areas of flat land. In the center of the state there is a small mountain chain called the Sierra de Fresnillo, from which much of the state's mineral wealth comes. In the extreme northwest there is another important mountain chain called the Sierra de Sombrerete, marked by a mountain called Sombreretillo, which is an important source of mineral wealth. Near this chain is another called the Sierra de Órganos.

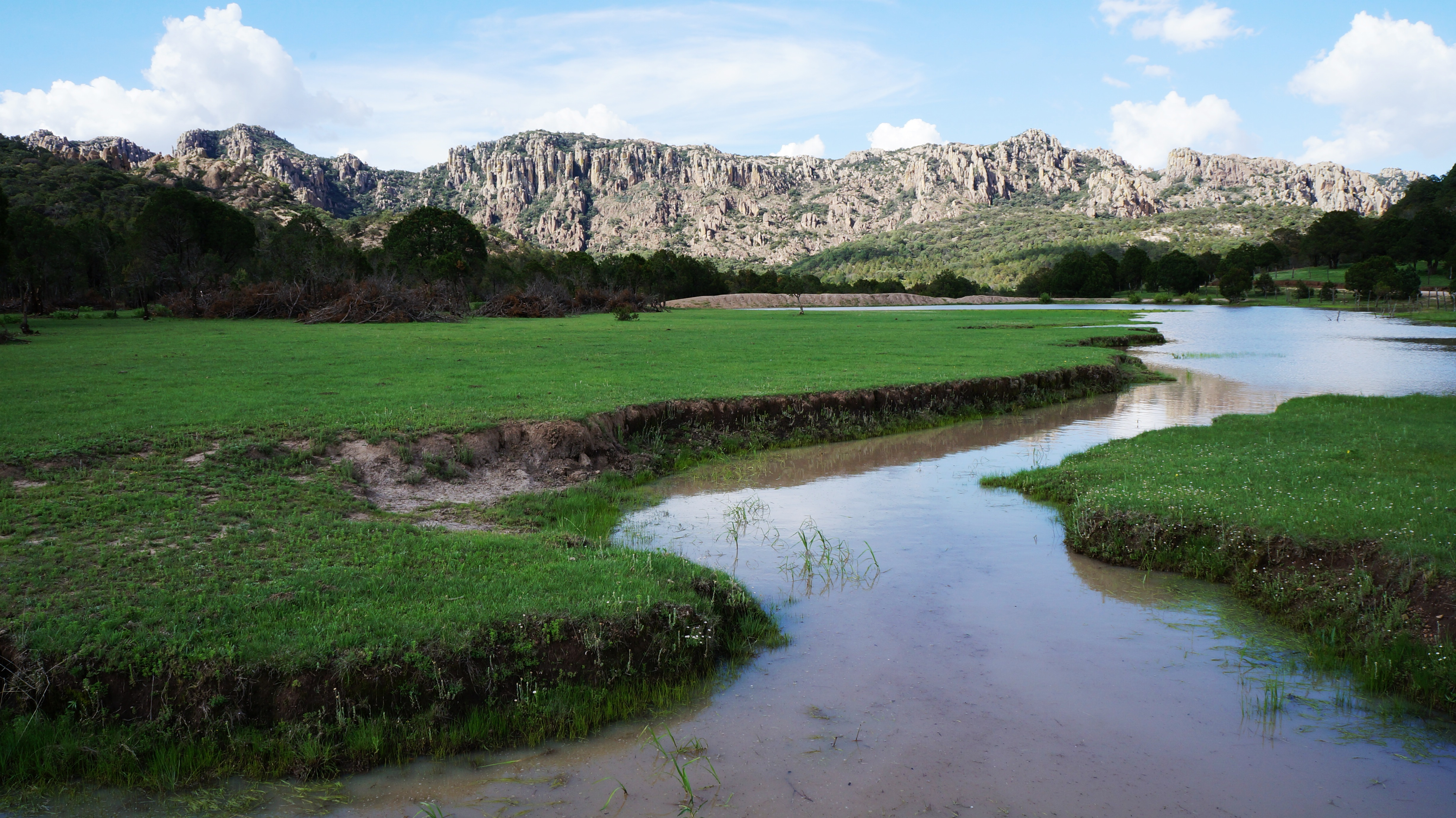
Stream in the Sierra de Cardos, part of the Sierra Madre Occidental

No major rivers run through the state and most of the waterways run only during the rainy season. The state is part of two water basins. The southeast of the state belongs to the Lerma River basin, which eventually empties in the Pacific Ocean. Rivers belonging to this basin include the San Pedro, Juchipila, Jerez and Tlaltenango. The other basin is smaller and endorheic, and does not empty into any ocean. The state has eighty dams with a total capacity of 595,337 million cubic meters. The largest of these are the Leobardo Reynoso in Fresnillo, Miguel Aleman in Tepechitlan and El Chique in Tabasco. Much of the state's water is underground divided into twenty hydraulic zones. These are accessed by over 5,800 wells, mostly for agricultural use.

Most of the territory has a cool, dry climate, although areas in the south have more moisture, with most rain falling between June and September. The driest and coldest areas are in the northeast, known as the Salado because of its saltwater lakes. 75% of the state is arid or semi-arid. 14% is arable and 79% is suitable for the grazing of livestock.

The average annual temperature is 16C with most of the state being temperate. The coldest months are from November to January, with frost not uncommon. The warmest month is June. The state gets an average rainfall of 400mm per year mostly in the summer, with the warmest and wettest part of the state is along the Sierra Madre Occidental.

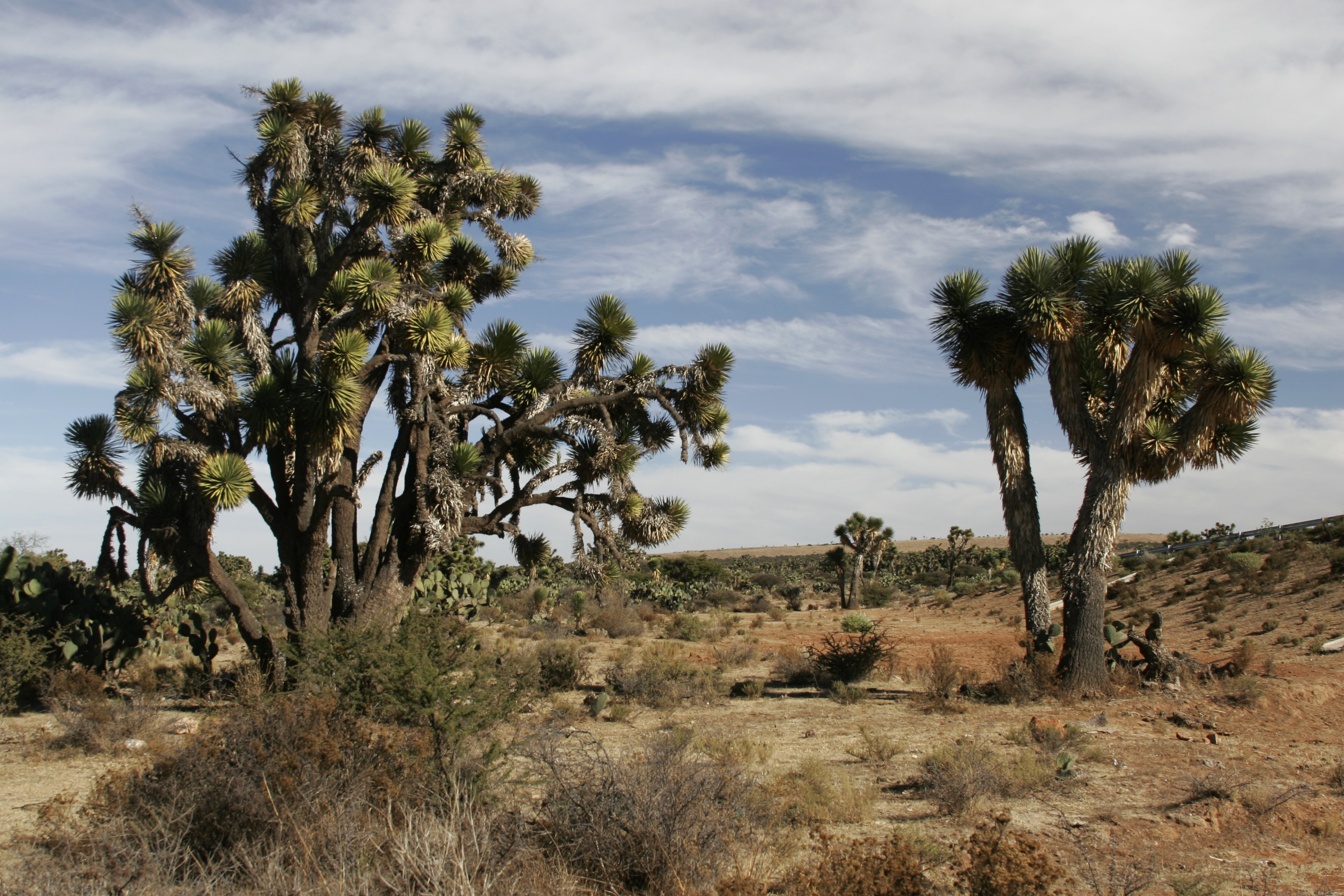
Yucca decipiens in the state

Ecosystems vary depending on relief, soil and temperature, leading to a wide variety of vegetation, including forests, scrub and grasslands. Arid areas are dominated by various species of cactus. In the far south there are deciduous trees that lose their leaves in winter and spring. Statewide the most common trees are mesquite, ironwood and palo verde (Parkinsonia). In the highest altitude, near the Jalisco border, there are mixed forests of pine and holm oak, with the latter dominating along the border with Durango and some along the border with San Luis Potosí. One interesting tree that occurs in Zacatecas is the elephant tree (Bursera microphylla). In the sierras there are many wild boar, white-tailed deer and hares; in the valleys and plains it is common to find coyote, badgers, quails and ducks. The extreme northern part of the state is the southern fringe of the Chihuahuan Desert and as such is rich and diverse in biology. This desert is home to a large amount of cacti and is one of the most ecologically diverse deserts on earth.

== History ==
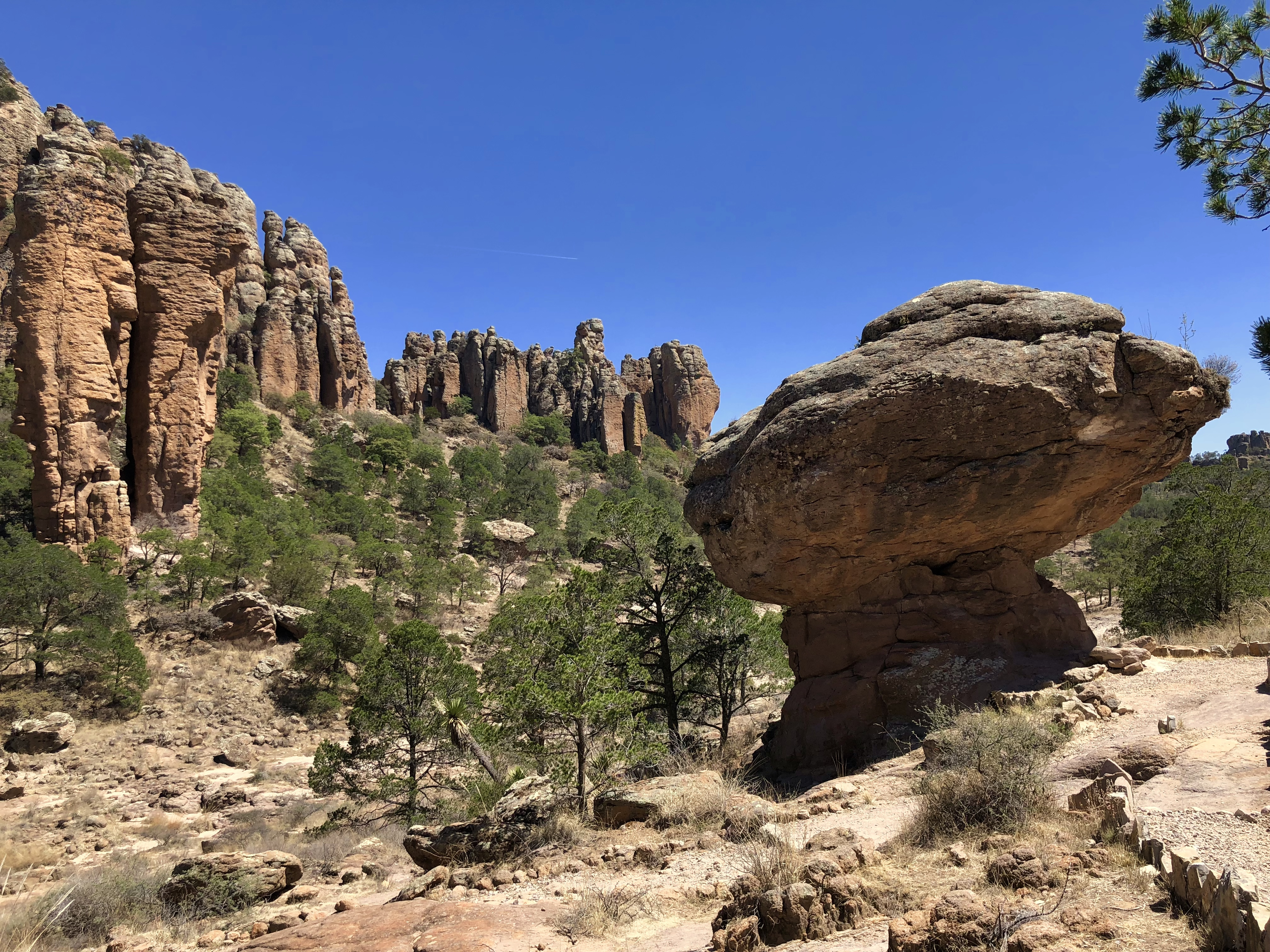
Sierra of Organos National Park

The state name derives from the name of its capital, Zacatecas. This word is derived from Nahuatl and means "where there is abundant zacate (grass)". The state seal depicts the Cerro de la Bufa, a landmark of the capital, surrounded by the weapons of the original inhabitants and below is the Latin motto Labor omnia vincit ("Work conquers all").

Before the arrival of the Spanish, dominant ethnic groups included the Caxcans, Zacatecos, and Guachichils, with a probable rivalry between the Guachichils and the Caxcans. The history of these peoples is unclear and it is not known when the first settlements were founded in the region. Between the fourth and tenth centuries CE, several large settlements developed such as Altavista, Chalchihuites and La Quemada, considered to be part of Greater Mesoamerica. Areas in the north of the state, without major settlements, were part of what is called Aridoamerica, where inhabitants lived off hunting and gathering. The first of the major population centers emerged along the Suchil, Graceros and Guadiana Rivers. The archaeological sites of today are all ceremonial centers and/or observatories in the center of metropolises.

The first Spanish settlement in the state's current borders was in what is now Nochistlan in 1531, the original Guadalajara. This settlement was later moved to its current location in Jalisco because of water supply problems and indigenous attacks. Zacatecas city was founded by Juan de Tolosa with the support of Cristobal de Oñate and Pedro Alméndez Chirinos in 1546, after the discovery of one of the world's richest silver veins. However, shortly afterwards most Spanish attention turned back south because of indigenous uprisings. The area remained dangerous for Spanish settlement because of the fierce opposition of the native peoples. In 1541, an indigenous leader named Tenamextle, also known as Francisco Tenamaztle and Diego the Aztec, rebelled, capturing and executing Spanish leader Miguel de Ibarra. The Spanish defeated the Caxcans during the Mixtón War in the 1540s. Tenamextle escaped the battle and continued to organize rebellions against the Spanish. However, the Spanish continued to push into Zacatecas because of its silver wealth, making it a province of Nueva Galicia. Although able to establish mining towns, convoys transporting the metal were regularly attacked.

Much of the state's colonial history to the present has been related to its mineral production, especially of silver. The first boom was from the Conquest to the mid 17th century. The riches drew settlers from the south, and in 1586, Phillip II gave the city the name of Noble and Loyal City of Nuestra Señora de los Zacatecas. In 1588, he authorized its coat of arms. Most of the state was evangelized by the Franciscans, who founded a hospice in the city in 1558 and by 1567 had built a large monastery. They officially took possession of its religious functions in 1603. Later other orders arrived, founding monasteries; but they did not evangelize the indigenous.

The next boom was in the early 18th century, with the state producing one-fifth of the world's silver. These riches supported the establishment of new settlements along with the building of elegant churches and mansions as the area became one of the most important of New Spain.

During the Mexican War of Independence, Miguel Hidalgo's troops marched through Zacatecas twice, once when they were attacking royalist troops and later when fleeing them. The war ended in 1821 and Zacatecas formally became a state in 1824, with the city of Zacatecas as its capital. Zacatecas continued to grow.

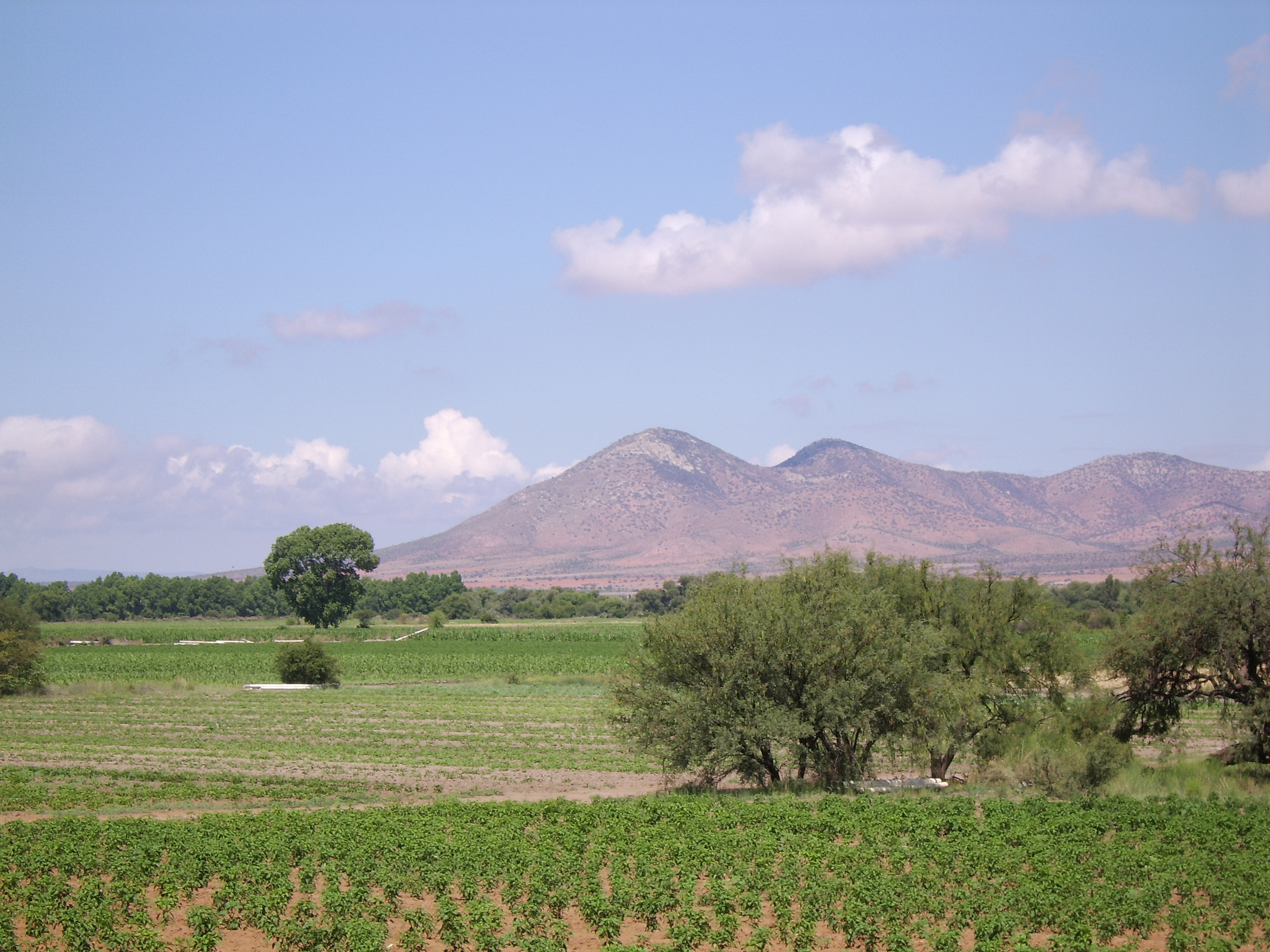
Agriculture in Fresnillo, Zacatecas, Mexico

The state's history during the rest of the 19th century was tumultuous, as it was in the rest of the country. From Independence until the 1860s, Liberal and Conservative elements occupied the capital at one time or another, until Liberal leader Jesús González Ortega seized control of the state permanently in 1859. This leader's decrees against Conservative sympathizers drove many Catholic priests out of the state. In 1861, French troops occupied Zacatecas but only for two years before being driven out. For the rest of the century, the state was mostly controlled by local strongmen, such as González Ortega, Trinidad García de la Cadena and Genero Codina. The fighting depressed silver production until near the end of the century, but it recovered enough to account for sixty percent of the state's export revenue.

At the end of the century, technological innovations such as the telegraph, telephone, electricity and rail lines connected the state with the rest of Mexico. Trains provided direct links to Ciudad Juárez, Aguascalientes and Chihuahua, which led to emigration out of the state, primarily to the United States in the 20th century.

Zacatecas was again a battleground with the outbreak of the Mexican Revolution in the early 20th century. One of the largest and most decisive battles of this conflict took place outside the capital and is called the Toma de Zacatecas (Taking of Zacatecas). This battle pitted the troops of Francisco Villa against those of Victoriano Huerta, resulting in the deaths of 7,000 soldiers and the wounding of 5,000. Civilian casualties were not recorded. The battle led to the naming of the city as a "Ciudad Heroica" (Heroic City).

In 1993, UNESCO named the historic center of Zacatecas as a World Heritage Site.

From 1998 to 2004, the state undertook a major project to expand the highway system.

== Demographics ==
Largest cities or towns in Zacatecas Source:
| Rank | | Municipality | Pop. |
|---|---|---|---|
| 1 | Guadalupe | Guadalupe | 170,029 |
| 2 | Fresnillo | Fresnillo | 143,281 |
| 3 | Zacatecas | Zacatecas | 138,444 |
| 4 | Jerez de García Salinas | Jerez | 46,132 |
| 5 | Víctor Rosales | Calera | 38,193 |
| 6 | Río Grande | Río Grande | 35,050 |
| 7 | Loreto | Loreto | 26,287 |
| 8 | Sombrerete | Sombrerete | 25,068 |
| 9 | Ojocaliente | Ojocaliente | 22,295 |
| 10 | Tlaltenango de Sánchez Román | Tlaltenango de Sánchez Román | 17,882 |

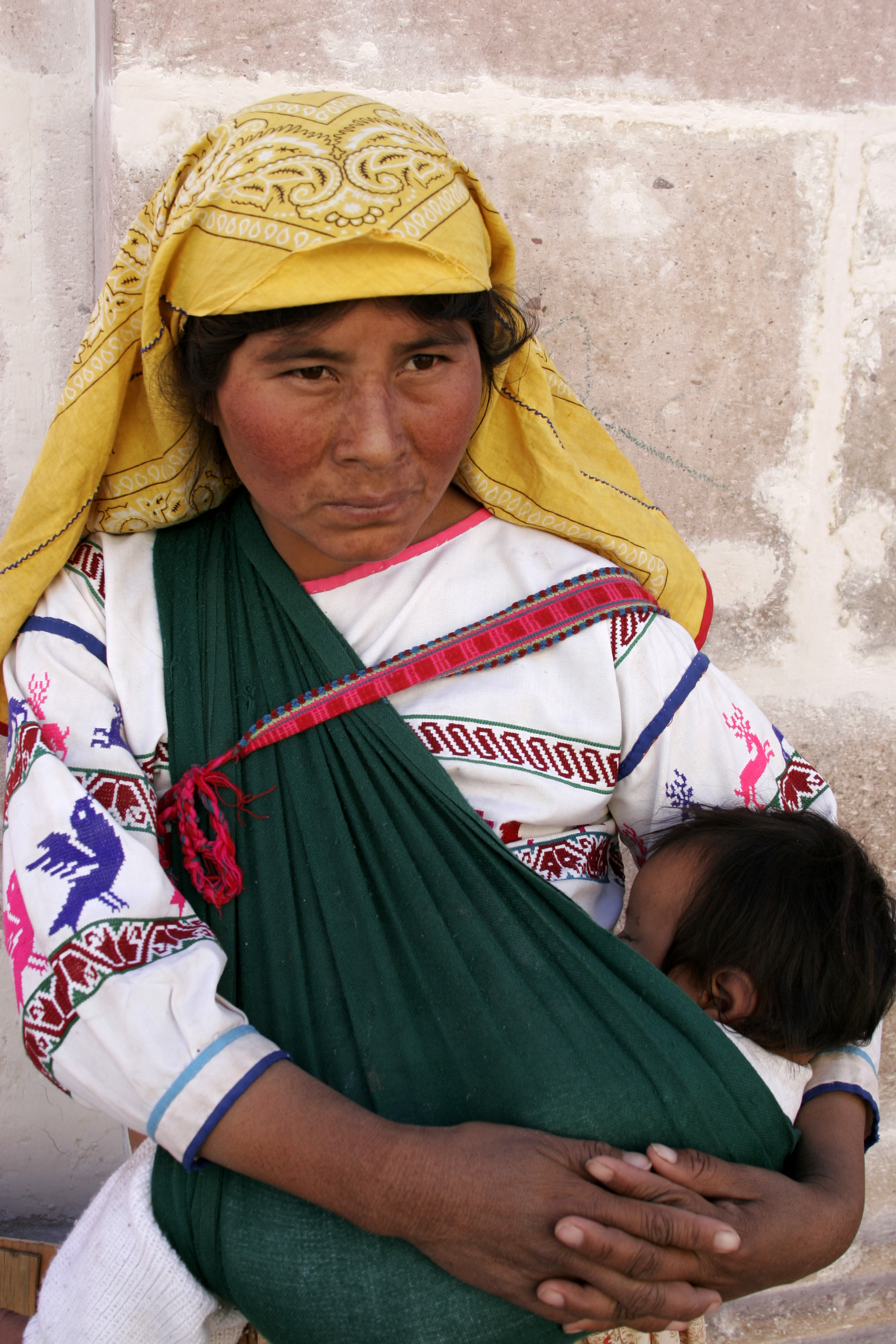
Huichol woman and child

Historical population
| Year | Pop. | ±% |
|---|---|---|
| 1895 | 456,241 | — |
| 1900 | 462,190 | +1.3% |
| 1910 | 477,556 | +3.3% |
| 1921 | 379,329 | −20.6% |
| 1930 | 459,047 | +21.0% |
| 1940 | 565,437 | +23.2% |
| 1950 | 665,524 | +17.7% |
| 1960 | 817,831 | +22.9% |
| 1970 | 951,462 | +16.3% |
| 1980 | 1,136,830 | +19.5% |
| 1990 | 1,276,323 | +12.3% |
| 1995 | 1,336,496 | +4.7% |
| 2000 | 1,353,610 | +1.3% |
| 2005 | 1,367,692 | +1.0% |
| 2010 | 1,490,668 | +9.0% |
| 2015 | 1,579,209 | +5.9% |
| 2020 | 1,622,138 | +2.7% |

As of 2020, the state had a population of 1,622,138. Forty-one percent of the population lives in rural areas, with a population density of 18.13 per square kilometer. Fifty-nine percent of the population lives in urban areas such as Fresnillo (pop. 213,139), Guadalupe (159,991), Zacatecas (138,176), Pinos, and Sombrerete. 94% of the population is Roman Catholic. In the year 2008, Zacatecas had the smallest indigenous population percentage-wise in Mexico: 0.3%. Only the state of Aguascalientes has a smaller number of indigenous people. Only four in 1,000 speak an indigenous language, compared to the national average of 60/1000. Indigenous languages spoken in the state include Huichol (1000 speakers), Nahuatl (500), Tepehuan (just under 500) and Tlapanec (about 400).

The population of Zacatecas has more than tripled in a century; in 1900 its population was 462,190. Since 1990, the state's population has grown by at least 1.3% per year. Average life expectancy is slightly above the national average at 74.1 years for men and 78.5 for women. Principal causes of death are heart problems, malignant tumors and diabetes.

The average number of years of schooling is 7.9 (second year of middle school), below the national average of 8.6. 5.9% have had no schooling at all and 66.8% have finished primary school. Only 12.3% have finished university level studies. 6% are illiterate.

Of those who leave the state permanently, most go to Aguascalientes, Jalisco and other northern states. Those who come to live in the state arrive from Jalisco, Aguascalientes and nearby northern states. It is estimated that one third of the people from Zacatecas do not reside in the state. In the 20th century, 6.1% of the 9.2 million migrants from Mexico to the United States were from the state of Zacatecas.

== Economy ==
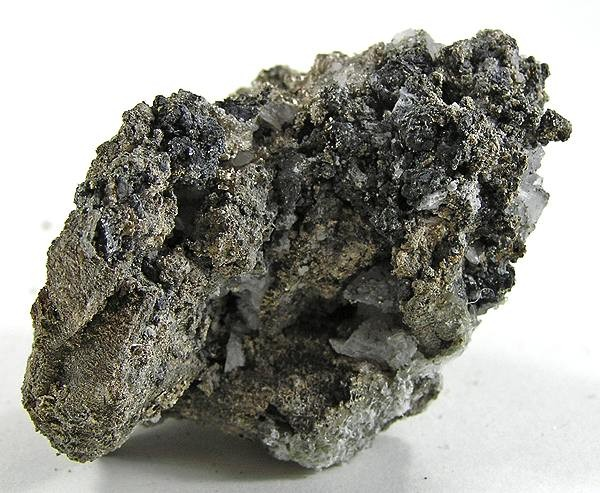
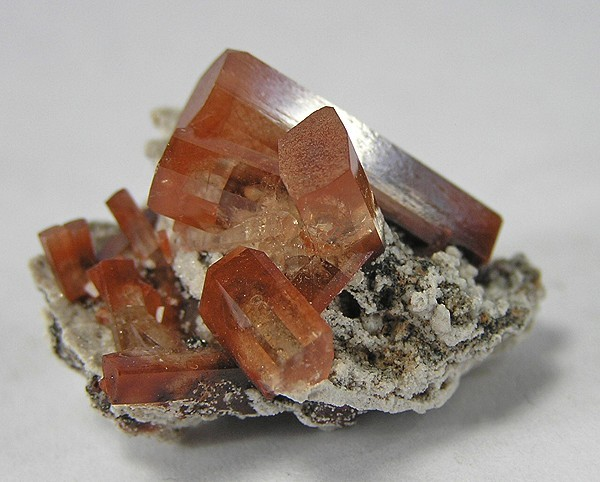
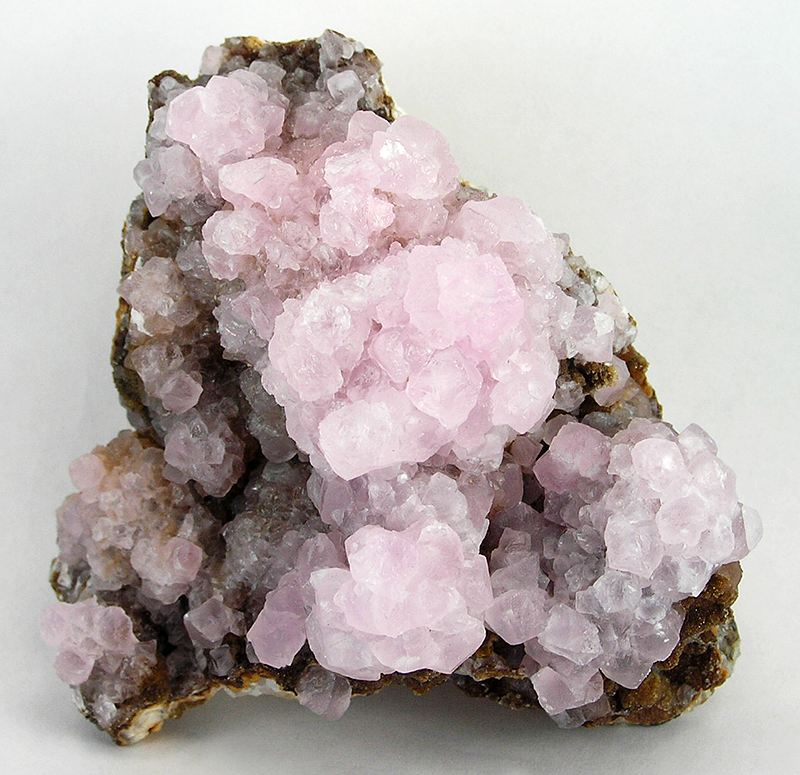
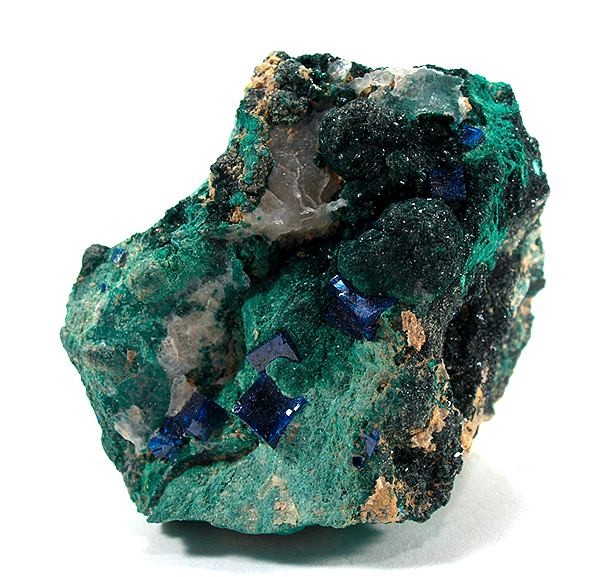
Some minerals that were found in the state's mines. Clockwise from upper left: Silver; Topaz; Atacamite-Boleite-Malachite; Calcite.

As in the colonial period, the state's dominant sector is mining, accounting for 13% of the state's GDP. The state is rich in minerals, mainly lead, zinc and copper with small quantities of gold and silver, along with non-metal mineral deposits such as kaolinite, wollastonite, fluorite and barite. The state has fifteen mining districts of which the most important are Fresnillo, Zacatecas, Concepción del Oro, Sombrerete and Chalchihuites, along with Nora de Angeles more recently. Zacatecas accounts for 21% of the country's gold production and 53.2% of its silver. Two of the largest silver mines in the world currently are operated in Zacatecas: former Peñoles subsidiary Fresnillo's Mina Proaño (also known as the Fresnillo Silver Mine), and the Peñasquito Polymetallic Mine. Zacatecas silver mostly accounts for Mexico's status as the world's largest producer of silver, accounting for 17% of the world's output.

Zacatecas's economy used to be almost completely centered on mining but has since diversified into cattle raising, agriculture, communications, food processing, tourism and transportation. Zacatecas is Mexico's main producer of beans, chili peppers, guavas and nopal, along with significant grain, sugar cane, grape and peach crops. It is also a major producer of rum, pulque and mezcal and even produces red wine. These activities account for just over ten percent of the state's GDP.

Manufacturing accounts for over twelve percent of the state's GDP and has attracted most of the state's foreign investment. Traditional handcrafts include weaving in Villa Garcia, saddles and jewelry in Jerez as well as furniture, leatherworking, miniatures, macramé, ironwork and pottery in various locations.

Tourism includes the capital along with the designation of "Pueblos Mágicos" such as Jerez, Teul de Gonzalez Ortega and Sombrerete, along with the shrine of the Santo Niño de Atocha, which is visited by thousands every year. It also includes archeological sites such as Alta Vista and La Quemada along with thermal springs such as Paraíso Caxcan.

Commerce and services accounts for over 53% of the GDP, mostly small scale operations.

== Media ==
Newspapers of Zacatecas include: El Sol de Zacatecas, La Jornada Zacatecas, and Zacatecas en Imagen.

== Culture, festivals, and traditions ==
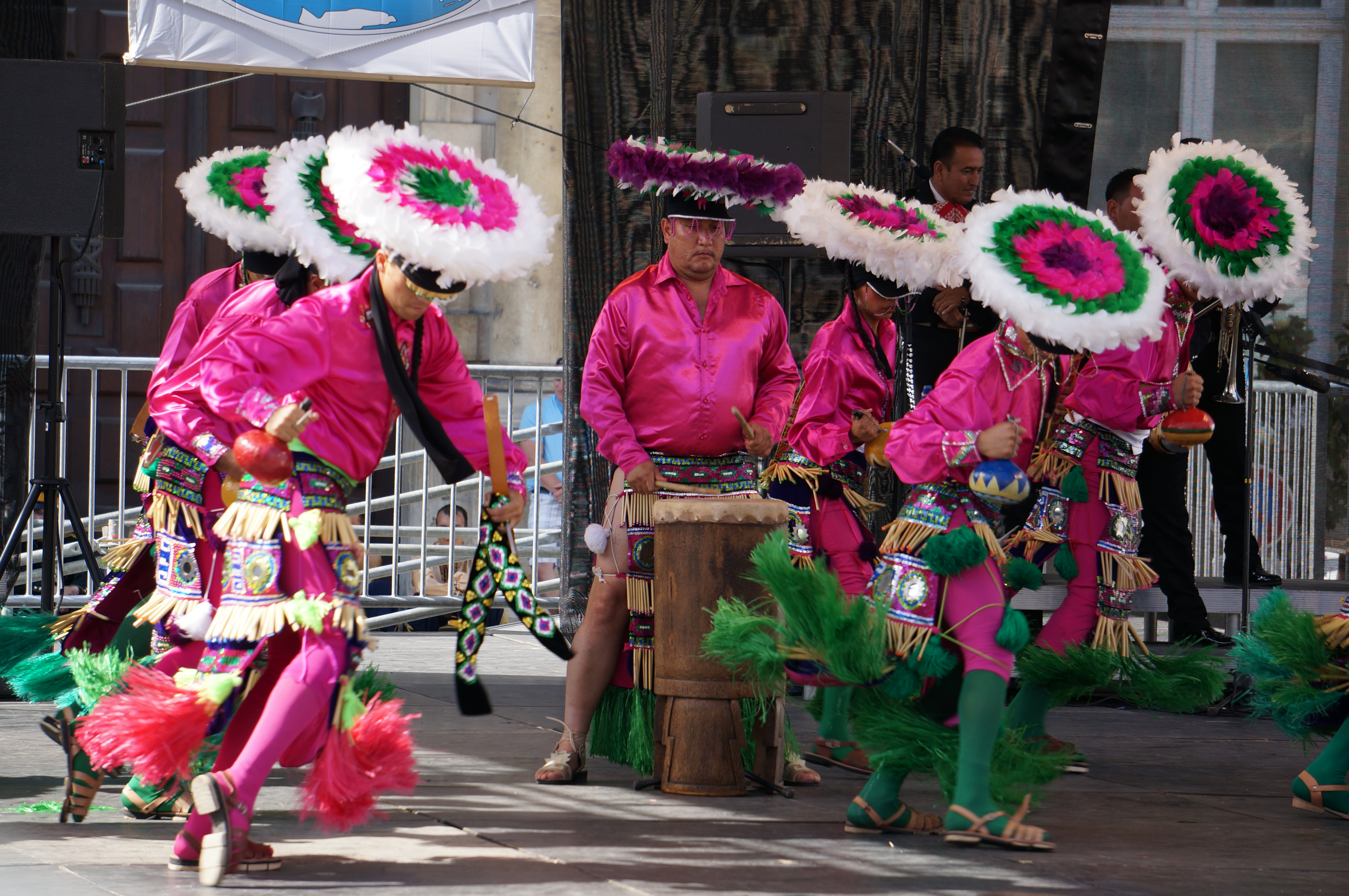
Zacatecan Danza de Matachines (Dance of the Matachines)

Most of the state's festivities are in honor of local patron saints and many of the secular festivals have links to religious ones. Such festivals often focus on recitals of traditional dances such as the Mexicapan. Many of these are derived from waltzes and polkas because of the state's mining history. The Mexican Revolution took a toll on the state's local musical traditions, but one that has survived is the Tamborazo, especially in Jerez.

In the state capital, September 8 is dedicated to the Virgen del Patrocinio on the Cerro de la Bufa, with various cultural and artistic events such as bullfighting, concerts, horse racing and culinary demonstrations. The last week of August is dedicated to the Morismas de Bracho, a theatrical production of the struggle between Moors and Christians.

It hosts the International Folklore Festival in August, featuring dance and costumes from around the world. It is held during Holy Week, and features music, food, street performances, dancing and parties.

Other major festivals include the Festival Cultural Zacatecas, the Feria Nacional de Zacatecas and the Internacional Festival de Teatro de Calle, Feria de Primavera de Jerez, the Feria del Libro, and the Cabalgata Turistica Revolucionaria.

Traditional favorite foods include gorditas and panecillos, both made from corn and can be sweet or savory, depending on the filling. Wheat breads include panochas and semitas. Condoches are gorditas made with fresh corn cooked in corn husks. Gorditas de cuajada are representative of food on ranches. Meat is most typically prepared as part of a stew to which vegetables such as corn, chickpeas, squash, rice and more are added. One well-known meat preparation is asado de boda, which is pork in a sauce made with mild red chili peppers. Traditional beverages include pulque, aguamiel, aguardiente and mezcal as well as a purely local beverage called colonche, made by fermenting a cactus fruit.

== Archeological sites ==
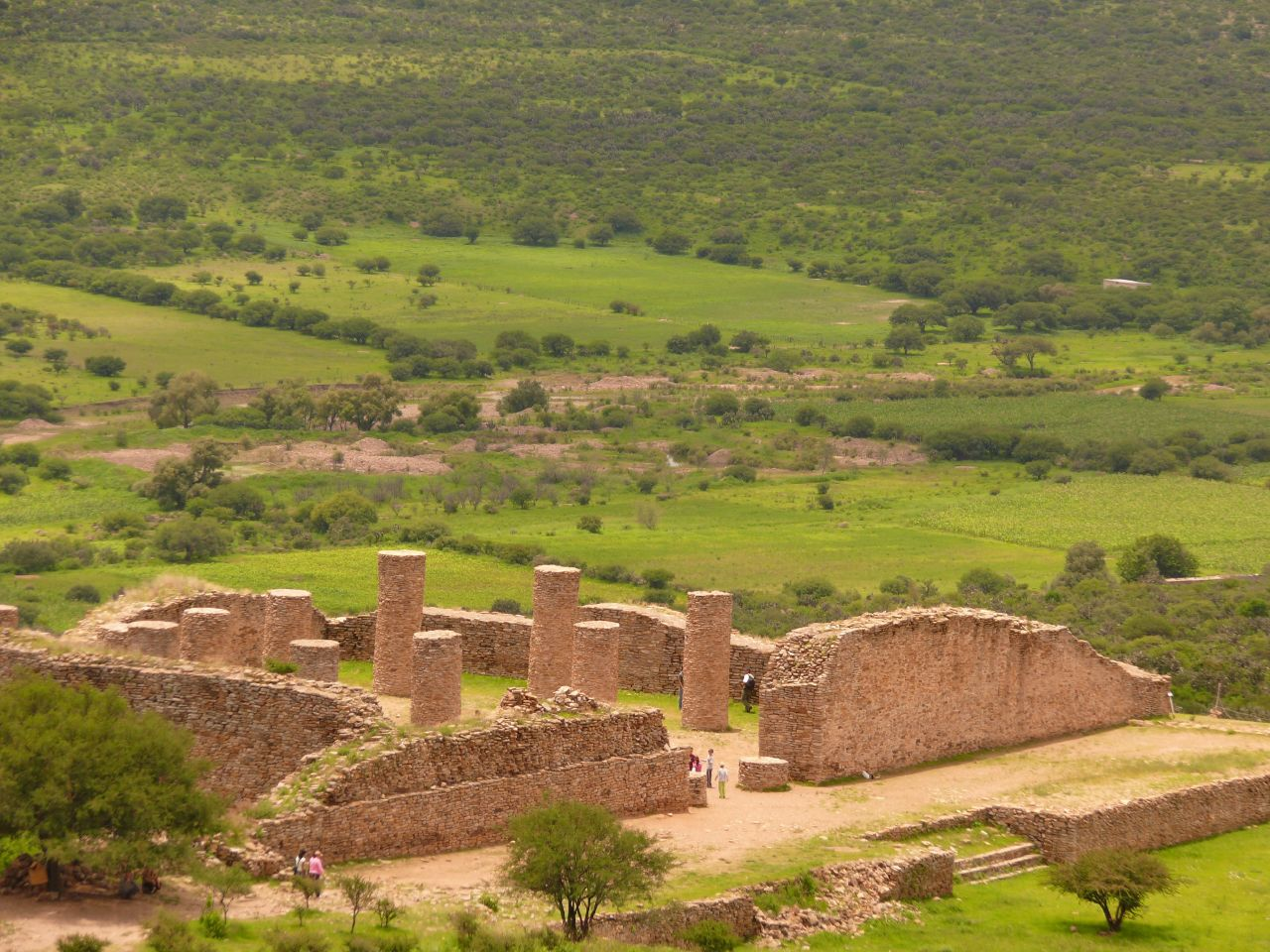
The Salón de las Columnas in La Quemada

Altavista is located 229 km northwest of the city of Zacatecas. It was a ceremonial center, part of the Chalchihuite culture, active between 200 and 1000 AD. It is named after a local ranch, and was explored for the first time at the beginning of the 20th century by Manuel Gamio. Its main building is called the Labyrinth.

La Quemada is located fifty km south of the city of Zacatecas, the state's largest pre Hispanic settlement. It developed between 500 and 900 AD and covered an area of over 70,000m2 at its height. Its name, which means "the burnt" comes from evidence that the city was burned and abandoned. Who occupied the city is not known, with speculation relating to Teotihuacan, the Purépecha and the Toltecs.

El Teúl is on a large hill overlooking the modern town of Teúl de González Ortega (municipality). The name comes from Nahuatl and means "of the gods". It was a ceremonial center, with residences located north of it. The site is noted for its pit burials as well as the oldest copper smelting facility in Mesoamerica. It was inhabited from 200 AD to 1531, when the Spanish destroyed it. It is one of several religious and population centers created by the Caxcans, who were semi nomadic, along with others in Tlaltenango, Juchipila and Teocaltiche.

== Major communities ==
- Chalchihuites
- Fresnillo
- Guadalupe
- Jalpa
- Jerez de García Salinas
- Juchipila
- Loreto
- Juan Aldama
- Moyahua de Estrada
- Nochistlán
- Ojocaliente
- Río Grande
- Sain Alto
- Sombrerete
- Tlaltenango de Sánchez Román
- Valparaiso
- Victor Rosales
- Villanueva
- Zacatecas

== See also ==
- Zacatecas rebellion of 1835
- Administrative divisions of Mexico
