= Viveros de Coyoacán =

Tree nursery and public park in Mexico City

Coordinates: 19°21′15.81″N 99°10′19.34″W

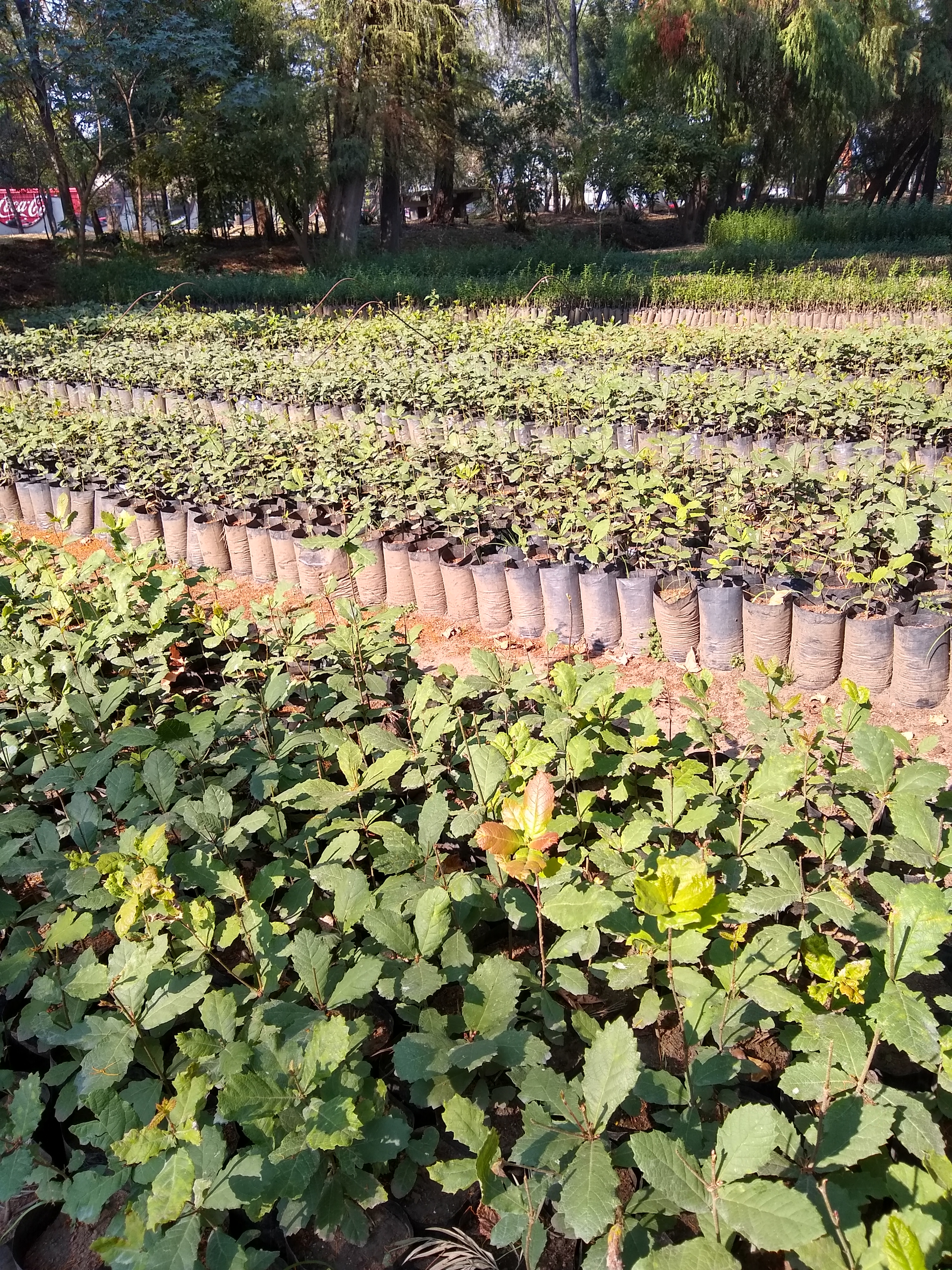
Native oak tree seedlings being grown at Viveros de Coyoacan

Viveros de Coyoacán is a combination tree nursery and public park which covers 38.9 hectares in the Coyoacán borough of Mexico City. The nursery was founded by Miguel Angel de Quevedo in the early 20th century as a way to provide seedlings for the reforestation of Mexico's badly damaged forests, especially around Mexico City. The first lands were donated by Quevedo himself with the federal government then getting involved, allowing for the planting of 140,000 trees between 1913 and 1914 alone. Today, the nursery produces one million seedlings per year mostly for projects around Mexico City. The park attracts between 2,500 and 3,000 visitors daily, many of whom come to exercise or feed the area's very tame squirrels. The overpopulation of squirrels and a large rat population have been problems for the park.

== Description ==
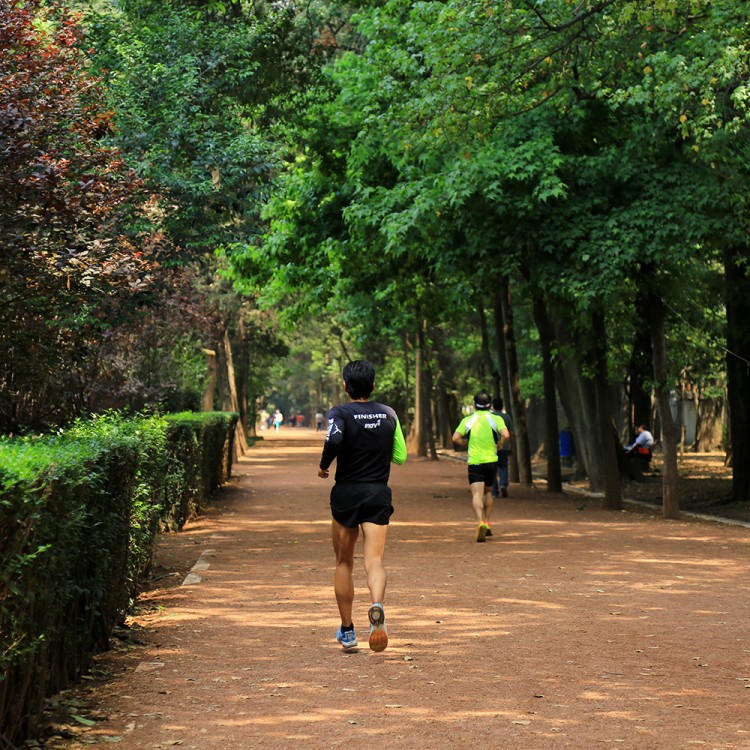
People jogging at Viveros.

The park has an extension of 38.9 hectares, located in the far west of the Coyoacán borough next to Ciudad Universitaria . From its initial creation by Miguel Angel de Quevedo, the area has operated primarily as a tree nursery, growing seedlings for reforestation projects. The nursery operation produces about one million seedlings per year, which are mostly planted in and around Mexico City. Most of the park's area is planted with trees, and it is considered to be one of Mexico City's “lungs.” Other areas are dedicated to seed beds, orchards and greenhouses. The area used to be part of a ranch called Panzacola, and a few remains of this can still be seen such as the ruins of a small rectangular chapel and a well, with a date marking of November 18, 1918.

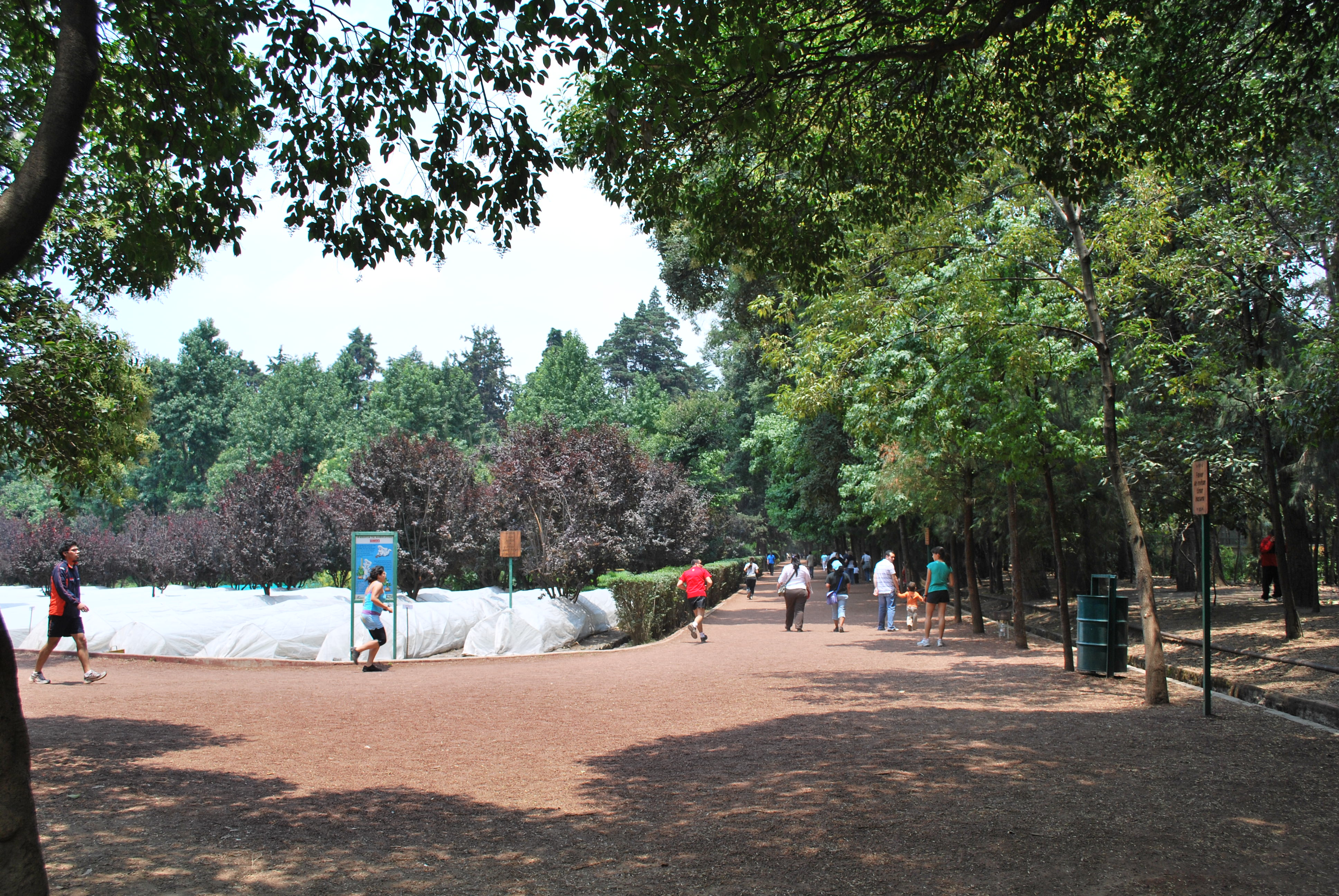
Jogging path in the park

In the 1930s, the area became open to the public as a park and today, Viveros receives anywhere from 2,500 to 3,000 visitors each day, many of whom come to exercise, especially along its jogging paths. Another popular pastime is the feeding of the park's very tame squirrels. Squirrel overpopulation is a serious problem at the park, provoked both by the feeding and by the fact that there are almost no predators. Only four wild falcons are known to live in the area. The squirrels cause damage to mature trees and more so to the young plants in the seed beds, as they scurry between them looking for a place to hide. To combat this problem, feeding is not permitted in the nursery areas but is still allowed in other areas of the park.

While most of the park's area is green space, 1.7 hectares are developed and used for a number of federal and local government offices. These include the offices of the Obras, Services y Desarrollo Urbano, Instituto Nacional de Investigaciones Forestales, Centro Cultural Ambiental, Secretaría de Medio Ambiente y Recursos Naturales, Comisión Nacional Forestal, Urbano de la Delegación Coyoacán, Servicio Nacional de Sanidad and Inocuidad y Calidad Agroalimentaria.

The park contains a popular plant market, and hosts five exhibitions each year. The first is for azaleas in February, followed by the Rose Exhibition in May, dahlias in August, houseplants in October and nativity scenes in December.

== History ==
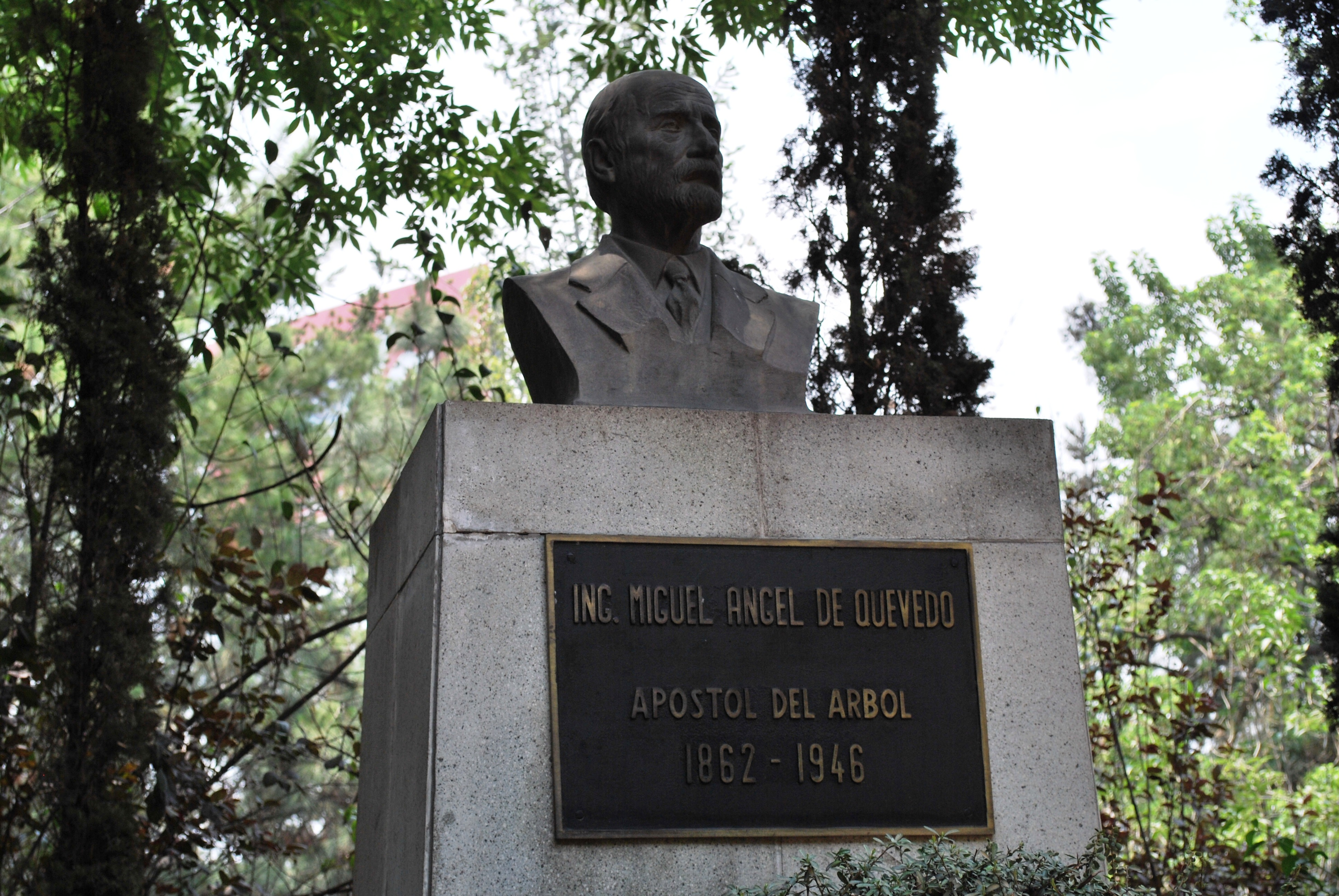
Bust of Miguel Angel de Quevedo

In the colonial period, this land was part of a very large ranch called Panzacola, whose main house can still be seen on Salvador Novo Street.

The establishment of a large scale nursery was the work of Miguel Angel de Quevedo. Quevedo made his fortune building a number of public and privates works in Mexico City and Veracruz, but he also saw the environmental damage and the consequences that these projects caused. In Quevedo's time, there were neither governmental nor private conservation agencies, nor were there laws regulating the use of forests. By the early 20th century massive deforestation was causing problems such as desertification, erosion, flooding from unimpeded runoff and more. Quevedo was the director of public works of Mexico City in the early 20th century and designed the roads extending Colonia Condesa and Colonia Roma, so that they would be wide and lined with trees, minimizing the loss of green space. He also traced out Avenida Insurgentes. In 1904, he founded the Junta Central de Bosques y Arbolados (Central Committee of Forests and Tree Areas), which was the first environmental protection institution in Mexico. This eventually gave rise to SEMARNAT. In 1921, he also founded the Sociedad Forestal Mexicana (Mexicana Forest Society), a civil association which survived intact until 1978, publishing a magazine called México Forestal for much of that time.

However, Quevedo's major environmental project was to create a system to produce and plant trees to reforest much of Mexico City's damaged landscape. Quevedo's plan was to produce enough trees to form a ten-kilometer (6-mile) ring of forests around the city to restore the landscape, regulate surface water flow and provide other benefits.

Seven years after its creation, the Viveros was the centerpiece of a system of nurseries which produced 2.5 million trees in the very early 20th century and allowed 140,000 trees to be planted from between July 1913 to February 1914 alone. Other facilities associated with Viveros were Bosque de Nativitas, Bosque de Aragón and the now disappeared parks of Santa Fe and Balbuena.

The first hectare of Viveros was donated by Quevedo in 1901. Originally the area had desert type plants but Quevedo planted it with trees, and began a nursery. Later, he acquired a portion of the San Pedro Martìr Hacienda, called Potrero del Altillo, with a surface of 301,452m^{2} and it was annexed to the original land. Viveros gained official recognition of existence and function by the government of Venustiano Carranza in 1917. Other portions of the park were acquired by federal authorities such as lands which formerly belonged to Angela Ramirez, Refugio Zamora and Maria de Jesùs de Mejía, which totaled about another 3 km^{2}. The final expanse bordered a ranch named Oxtopulco, which today is the Ciudad Universitaria. This participation is considered to be one of the first expressions of a government environmental policy in Mexico.

The primary function of the area from its conception has been that of a tree nursery, to grow and acclimate seedlings to be planted in reforestation projects. It was the first of its kind in Mexico and the first large-scale tree nursery in Latin America. Quevedo also established here the Escuela Forestal (Forestry School) in 1934. This school became the Department of Forestry under the Secrtaria of Agriculture. In 1938, the town of Coyoacan was declared a national park, which included the area of the nursery and opened to the public to allow it to see the nursery work and to allow recreational activities.

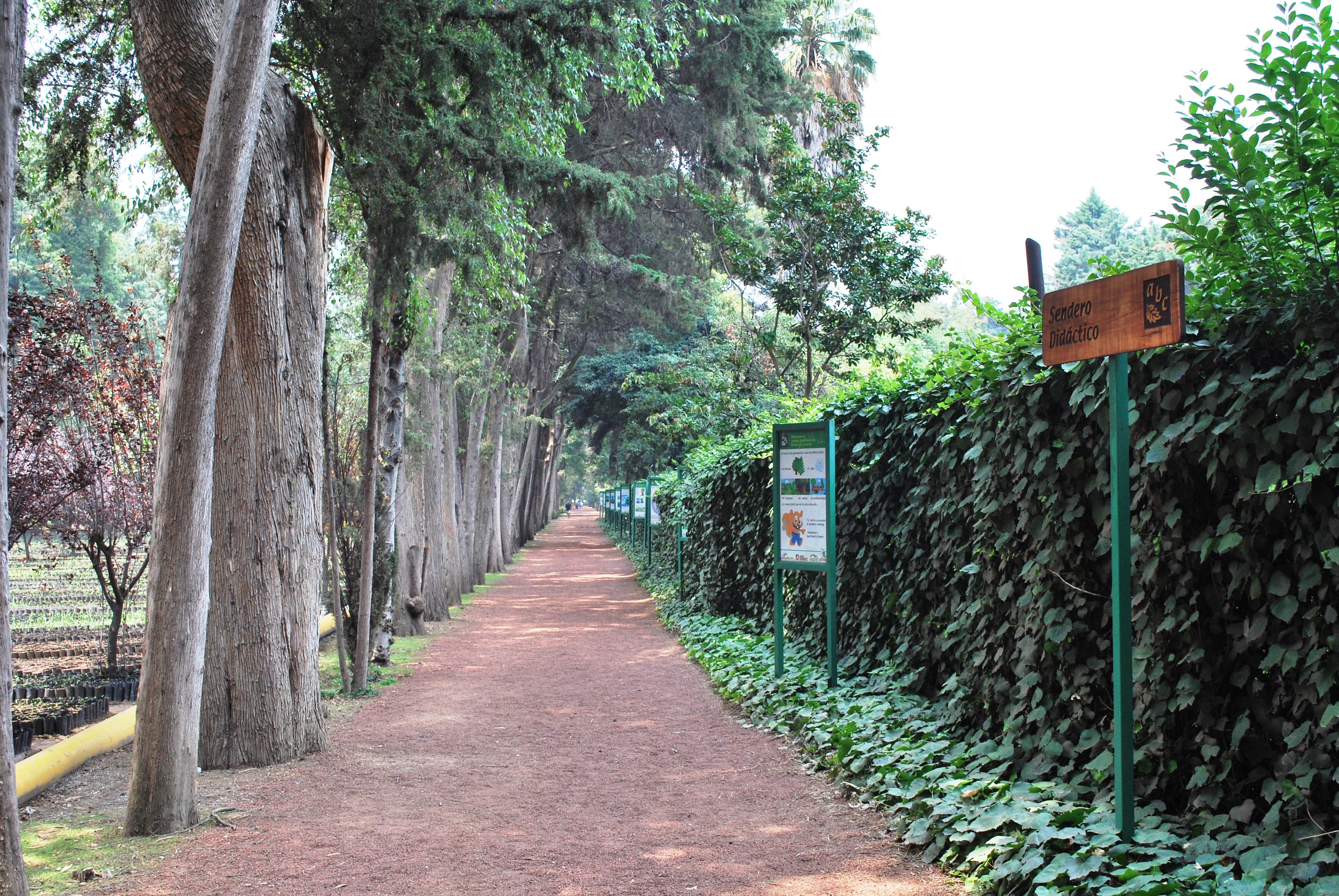
path with instructional panels on ecology

The importance of the park has grown, especially since the 1970s, when schools began to bring class outings here. In the 1980s, Viveros began to offer exhibitions in floriculture as well as various sporting activities, especially jogging with the installation of tracks. By 1995, the park was clocking about 1,000 visitors who were coming just to exercise.

By the 2000s, the number of visitors had grown to between 2,500 and 3,000, which has led to some problems, mostly problems with rodents. The feeding of squirrels is a popular pastime in the park, which has led to overpopulation damaging plants. In 2005, city authorities estimated that there were also 10,000 rats in the park. The rats are attracted and sustained by food brought into the park by people, either for themselves or for the squirrels. Although the city does not consider them to be a health threat and the rats do not leave the park and invade neighboring homes, a program for their extermination was put into place because the concentration was considered to be the highest in the city. Extermination efforts mostly have consisted in the placing of environmentally friendly poisoned bait in areas where the rats congregate, repeating every two years.

From 2007 to 2009, the government allowed a small alternative circus called “Otro” (Other) to operate on the grounds as a form of culture. The circus had been giving workshops in juggling and other arts in the park since 2000. It combined traditional circus acts with theatrical performances. It practiced during the week and gave performances on weekends in the Parque Gorostiza section of the park. The circus was not allowed to charge admission but it could solicit donations after shows. It also offered workshops as well. It was forced to close by city and borough authorities who cited a number of reasons for the action.

Today the park/nursery is managed by Secretariat of Environment and Natural Resources, and it along with a number of other environmental organizations have had offices in the park. In 2010, The Secretariat of Agriculture announced plans to build a six-story structure and 360-space parking facility in the park, to cover 2,450m2. However, due to strong opposition from the borough, as well as the descendants of Quevedo who stated they would sue for the land if the original donation stipulations were not honored, the proposal for construction was rescinded. In 2011, the offices of Obras, Services y Desarrollo Urbano (Works, Services and Urban Development) were removed, freeing 2,691m^{2} to be returned to green space.

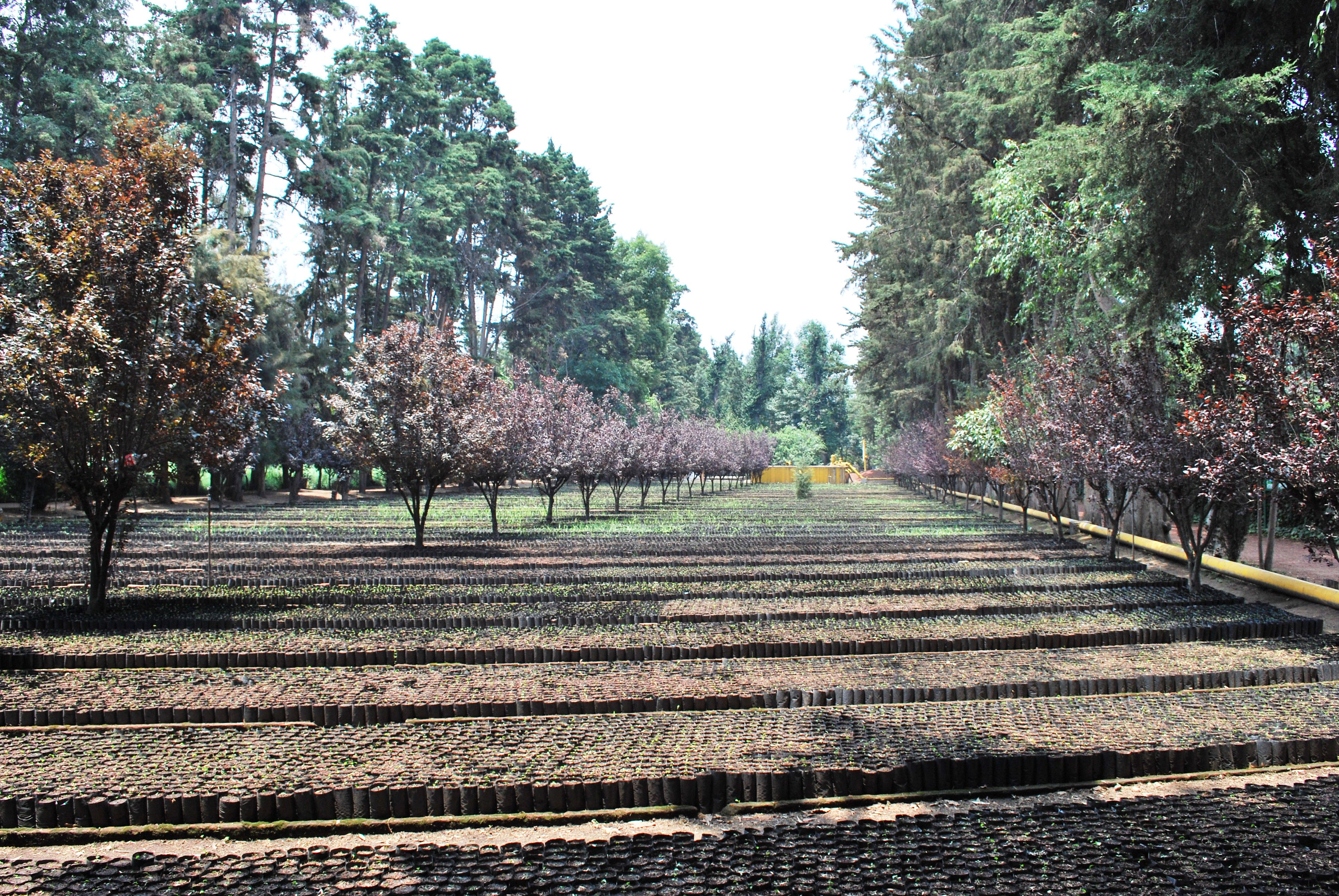
Saplings
