= Miguel Ángel de Quevedo =

Mexican architect (1862–1946)

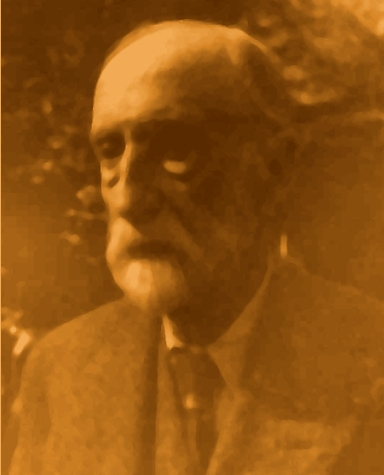
Miguel Ángel de Quevedo.

Miguel Ángel de Quevedo (September 27, 1862 – July 15, 1946) was a Mexican architect, engineer, and environmentalist who founded Mexico City's Viveros de Coyoacán arboretum, as well as numerous other construction projects in Mexico City, and throughout the country, and promoted the conservation of Mexico's forests. He is called el apóstol del árbol ("the apostle of the tree") for his dedication to the defense of Mexico's forests.

== Biography ==
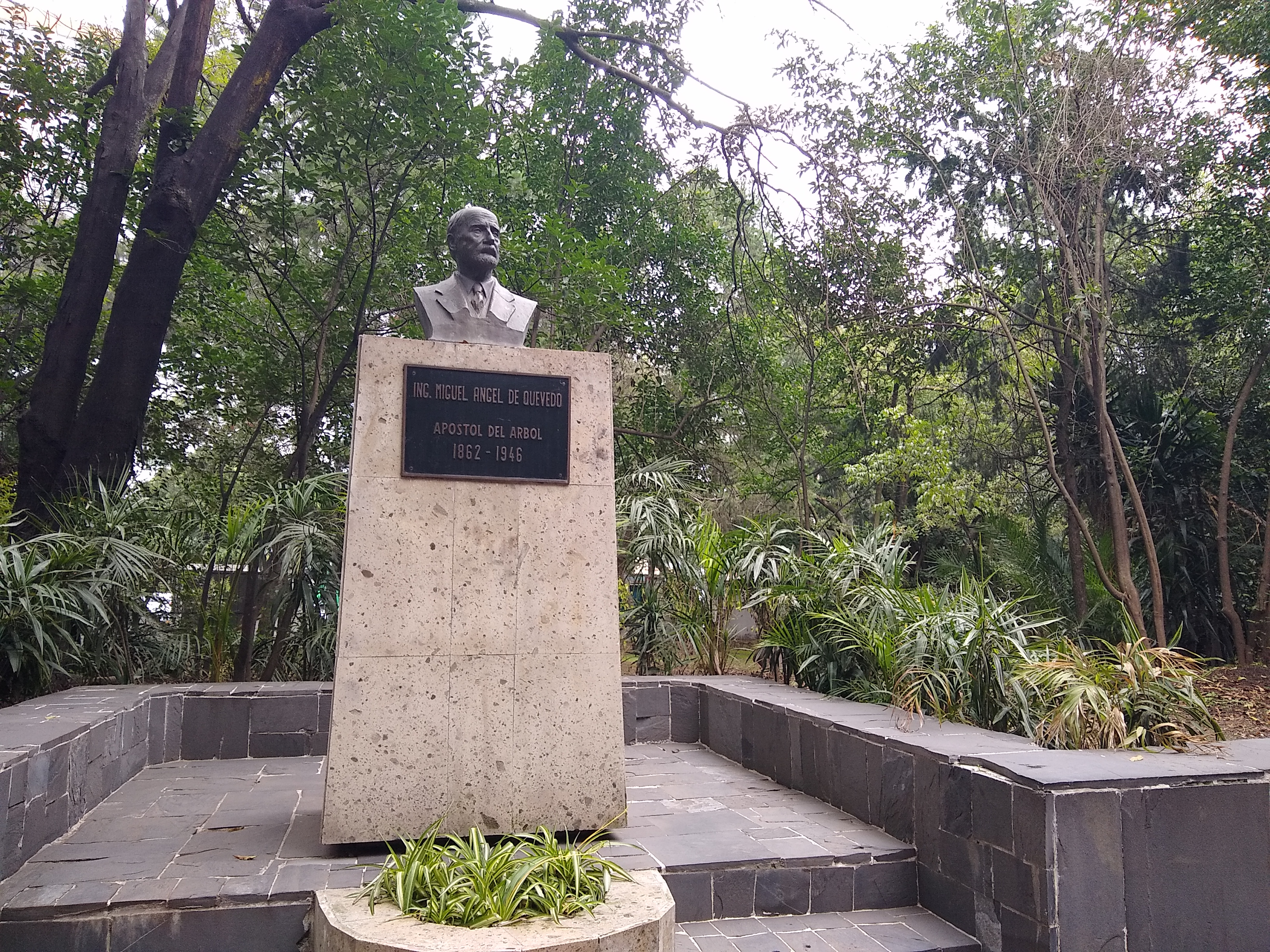
Memorial to its founder Miguel Angel de Quevedo in the forest of Viveros de Coyocan, Mexico City

Don Miguel Ángel de Quevedo was born in Guadalajara, Jalisco, in 1862, to wealthy parents who died when Quevedo was young. He spent much of his childhood in France. In 1887, he completed studies in France at the École Polytechnique in hydrological engineering and then returned to Mexico. He worked for the Secretary of Agriculture for a period under president Porfirio Díaz. Quevedo founded the Sociedad Forestal Mexicana (Mexican Forestry Society), Viveros de Coyoacán, and promoted the creation of small wooded areas near train stations. As an engineer, he constructed the Banco de Londres y México building and pioneered the use of hydro-electric power with a plant on the Río Blanco in Orizaba, Veracruz. Quevedo worked on the long-term, large-scale project to drain the lake system in the Valley of Mexico, begun in the colonial era and completed during the presidency of Porfirio Díaz. He resigned from that project following a workplace accident, but he went on to other government service.

Lázaro Cárdenas recruited Quevedo to his presidential administration to work on forestry issues. Quevedo became involved with the newly established Institute of Forest Research starting in 1936. The institute's staff began compiling data on Mexico's geography and forests with an inventory of tree species. The institute also undertook an assessment of the qualities of commercially valuable trees in order to assess how climate and soil affected their growth. The aim of these initiatives was to create a baseline of scientific data Mexico's forests in order to manage them as a national resource. Some of Quevedo's vigorous efforts to defend Mexico's forests were met with violent resistance from campesinos and agricultural officials who accused him of imposing draconian measures.

Quevedo died in Mexico City on July 15, 1946.

== Honors ==
Today a thoroughfare in Mexico City- Avenida Miguel Ángel de Quevedo, as well as a subway station (Metro Miguel Ángel de Quevedo), both in the southern Mexico City borough of Coyoacán, are named in his honor. There is also a monument to dedicated to him in the Viveros de Coyocan.

== See also ==
- Viveros de Coyoacan
