= Érick =

Érick, or Erick, is a given name. Notable people with the name include:

- Érick Aguirre (born 1997), Mexican professional footballer
- Érick Ávalos (born 2000), Mexican professional footballer
- Érick Barrondo (born 1991), Guatemalan racewalker
- Érick Gutiérrez (born 1995), known as Guti, Mexican professional footballer
- Érick Jacquin (born 1964), French chef, naturalized Brazilian
- Erick Iván Ortiz (born 1991), Salvadoran politician, activist
- Érick Valencia Salazar (born 1977), known as El 85, Mexican drug lord
- Érick Sánchez (born 1999), known as Chiquito, Mexican professional footballer
- Érick Silva Santos (born 1970), Mexican politician, mayor of Matamoros, Tamaulipas
- Érick Schmitt, held a kindergarten class in Neuilly-sur-Seine, France, hostage for two days
- Érick Vallecillo (born 1980), Honduran football defender

== See also ==
- Eric (given name)
