= Francisco Javier Mayorga Castañeda =

Mexican businessman and politician

Secretary of Agriculture, Livestock, Rural Development, Fisheries and Food (Mexico)
- In office 7 September 2009 – 1 December 2012
- President: Felipe Calderón
- Preceded by: Alberto Cárdenas
- Succeeded by: Enrique Martinez
- In office 28 September 2005 – 30 November 2006
- President: Vicente Fox
- Preceded by: Javier Usabiaga
- Succeeded by: Alberto Cárdenas

secretary of Rural Development (Jalisco)
- In office 1995–2000
- Governor: Alberto Cárdenas

Personal details
- Born: 17 April 1951 (age 75) Guadalajara, Jalisco
- Party: National Action Party
- Education: Instituto Tecnológico Autónomo de México, Monterrey Institute of Technology (ITESM)
- Occupation: Businessman and politician

Francisco Javier Mayorga Castañeda (born 17 April 1951) is a Mexican businessman and politician who served as Secretary of Agriculture in the cabinet of President Felipe Calderón from 7 September 2009 to November 30, 2012. He had previously served in the same post from 28 September 2005 to 30 November 2006 in the administration of President Vicente Fox.

== Early years ==
Mayorga was born in Guadalajara, Jalisco, into a family of eight brothers devoted to grain trade in the Western part of the country. He graduated with a bachelor's degree in Economics from the Autonomous Institute of Technology of Mexico (ITAM) and completed a master's degree in Business Administration at the Monterrey Institute of Technology (ITESM) before presiding several business chambers in his native state.

== As Secretary of Agriculture ==
Mayorga was appointed Secretary of Agriculture for the first time in the administration of President Vicente Fox. His second appointment, in the cabinet of Felipe Calderón, was criticised by Greenpeace for his alleged continuous support to genetically modified food trading within the country.
