= Cabinet of Alberto Cárdenas =

Cabinet of former Governor of Jalisco, Alberto Cárdenas Jiménez

Cabinet of Alberto Cárdenas Jiménez
- Cabinet of State of Jalisco
- Date formed: 1 March 1995
- Date dissolved: 28 February 2001

People and organisations
- Governor: Alberto Cárdenas Jiménez
- Governor's history: Former Municipal president of Ciudad Guzmán (1991–1994)
- No. of ministers: 14
- Total no. of members: 16
- Member party: National Action Party
- Status in legislature: Majority government (1995–1998) (1998–2001)
- Opposition party: PRI

History
- Election: 12 February 1995 Jalisco gubernatorial election
- Legislature terms: 54th Jalisco Legislature (15/03/1995–31/01/1998); 55th Jalisco Legislature (01/02/1998–31/01/2001)
- Advice and consent: Congress of the State of Jalisco
- Predecessor: Cabinet of Carlos Rivera Aceves
- Successor: Cabinet of Francisco Javier Ramírez Acuña

Alberto Cárdenas Jiménez assumed office as Governor of the State of Jalisco on 1 March 1995, and his term ended on 28 February 2001. The governor has the authority to nominate members of his Cabinet of the State of Jalisco, as per the Ley Orgánica del Poder Ejecutivo del Estado de Jalisco, Article 4, Section V.

== Cabinet ==
Office	Holder	Term	Political party
Secretaría General de Gobierno; General Secretariat of Government	Raúl Octavio Espinoza Martínez; Fernando Guzmán Pérez Peláez; Felipe de Jesús Preciado Coronado; Mauricio Limón Aguirre	01/03/1995–25/02/1998; 25/02/1998–11/08/2000; 11/08/2000–14/12/2000; 15/12/2000–28/02/2001	PAN; PAN; PAN; PAN
Secretaría de Finanzas Secretariat of Finance	José Levy García Juan Antonio González Hernández	01/03/1995–14/12/2000; 15/12/2000–28/02/2001	PAN; PAN
Secretaría de Administración; Secretariat of Administration	Carlos Rodríguez Combeller; César Luis Coll Carabias	01/03/1995–28/02/1998; 01/03/1998–28/02/2001	PAN; PAN
Secretaría de Educación Secretariat of Education	Efraín González–Luna Morfín; Miguel Agustín Limón Macías	01/03/1995–16/12/1998; 17/12/1998–28/02/2001	Unaffiliated (he left the PAN in 1978); PAN
Secretaría de Salud Secretariat of Health	Cristóbal Ruiz Gaytán López	01/03/1995–28/02/2001	PAN
Secretaría de Vialidad Secretariat of Ways	Germán Vicente Camacho Uribe	01/03/1995–28/02/2001	PAN
Procuraduría General de Justicia del Estado State General Attorney of Justice	Jorge López Vergara; Pedro Raúl Mendieta Fernández; Félix Javier Ledesma Martínez Negrete; Roberto Aguilera Hernández	01/03/1995–04/04/1997; 04/04/1997–28/02/1998; 01/03/1998–14/02/2000; 14/02/2000–28/02/2001	PAN
Secretaría de Desarrollo Urbano Secretariat of Urban Development	Carlos Petersen Biester	01/03/1995–28/02/2001	PAN
Secretaría de Desarrollo Rural Secretariat of Rural Development	Francisco Javier Mayorga Castañeda; Rodrigo Diez de Sollano	01/03/1995–31/12/2000; 01/01/2001–28/02/2001	PAN; Unaffiliated
Secretaría de Promoción Económica Secretariat of Economic Promotion	Sergio Alejandro García de Alba Zepeda	01/03/1995–28/02/2001	PAN
Secretaría de Turismo Secretariat of Tourism	Pablo Gerber Stump	01/03/1995–28/02/2001	PAN
Secretaría de Cultura Secretariat of Culture	Guillermo Schmidhuber de la Mora	01/03/1995–28/02/2001	Unaffiliated
Contraloría del Estado Comptrollership of the State	Jorge Luis Eng Gómez	01/03/1995–28/02/2001	PAN
Coordinación General de Asesores General Coordination of Advisers	Fernando Guzmán Pérez Peláez; Carlos Rodríguez Combeller	01/03/1995–25/02/1998; 01/03/1998–28/02/2001	PAN; PAN
Dirección de Comunicación Social Social Communication Department	Juan María Naveja de Anda	01/03/1995–28/02/2001	PAN
Secretario Particular Particular Secretary	Fernando Garza Martínez; Juan Antonio González Hernández; José Manuel Bulás Montoro	01/03/1995–18/03/1996; 18/03/1996–14/12/2000; 15/12/2000–28/02/2001	PAN; PAN
