= Víctor Villalobos =

Mexican politician

Víctor Manuel Villalobos Arámbula
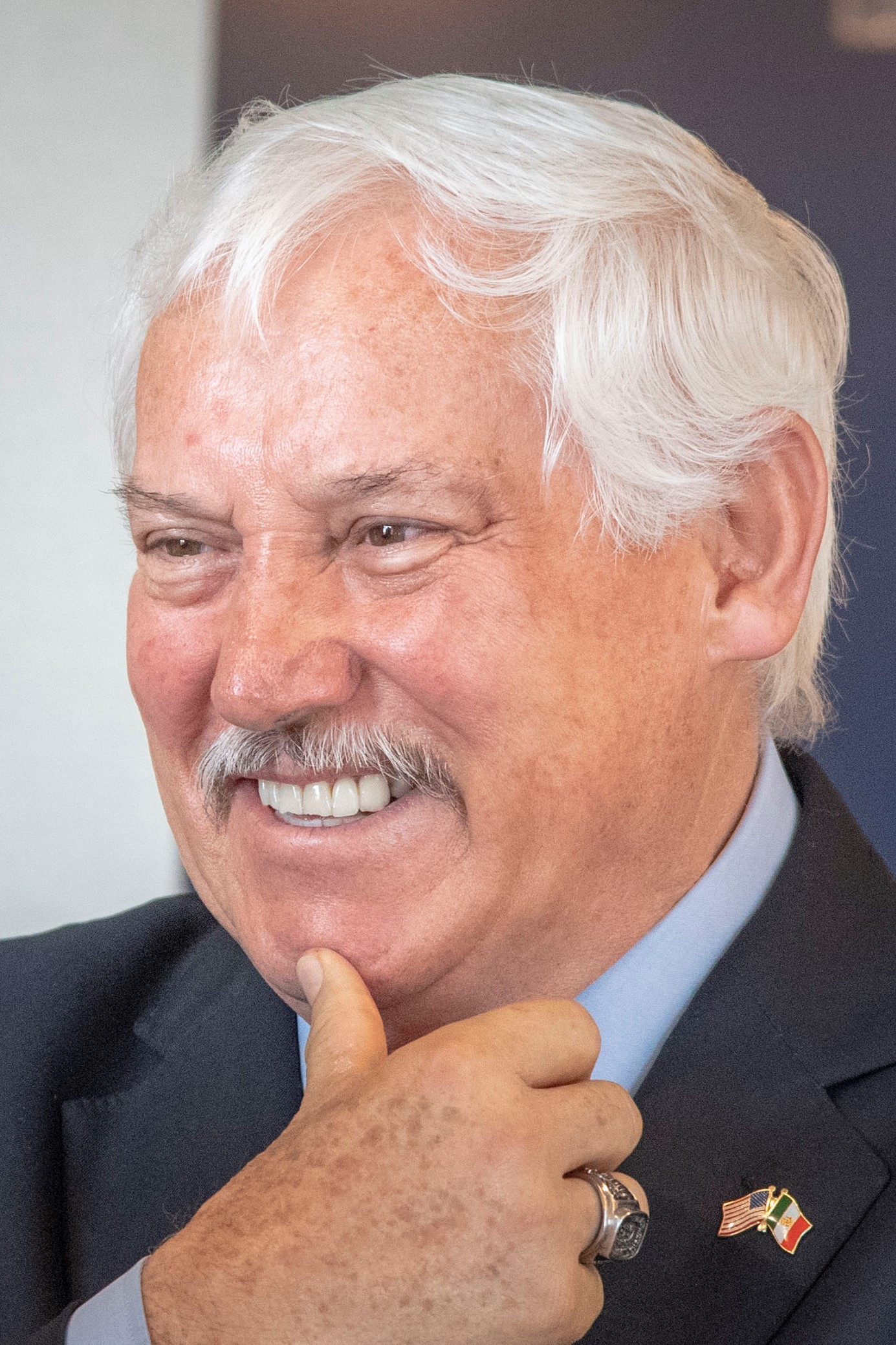

Secretary of Agriculture and Rural Development
- In office 1 December 2018 – 30 September 2024
- President: Andrés Manuel López Obrador
- Preceded by: Baltazar Hinojosa Ochoa
- Succeeded by: Julio Berdegué Sacristán

Director General of the IICA
- In office 15 January 2010 – 15 January 2018
- Preceded by: Chelston W.D. Brathwaite
- Succeeded by: Manuel Otero Justo

Personal details
- Born: 1950 (age 75–76) Mexico City, Mexico
- Education: Chapingo Autonomous University; University of Calgary
- Occupation: Agricultural engineer; geneticist; politician
- Profession: Agronomy

Víctor Manuel Villalobos Arámbula is an agricultural engineer with a specialty in agronomy who served as the Secretary of Agriculture and Rural Development (SADER) in the administration of Mexican President Andrés Manuel López Obrador (AMLO).

Dr. Villalobos is an expert in agriculture and natural and genetic resources. He has been a professor, researcher, research director, international official, government official, administrator, and leader of multidisciplinary analysis and decision groups.

== Education ==
Víctor Villalobos earned his bachelor's degree in agricultural engineering and his master's degree in plant genetics from the Chapingo Autonomous University (UACH) in Texcoco, State of Mexico. His doctorate from the University of Calgary, Canada, is in plant morphology. He has worked as a professor at the Chapingo Autonomous University, the College of Postgraduates (COLPOS), and the Center for Research and Advanced Studies of the National Polytechnic Institute of Mexico (CINVESTAV), where he served as director of the Irapuato Unit. He has taught specialized courses in Argentina, Austria, Colombia, Costa Rica, Chile, Ecuador, Jordan, Iran, Venezuela, and other countries.

Villalobos has been a consultant for the Consultative Group for International Agricultural Research (CGIAR), a member of the National Council of Science and Technology (CONACYT) of Mexico, and a member of the Institute of the University of California for Mexico and the United States (UCMexus).

Villalobos worked for the Tropical Agricultural Research and Higher Education Center (CATIE) in Costa Rica from as director of the agriculture division (1986–1990), director (1990–1995), and CEO (1999–2003).

== Career ==
Prior to his appointment as Agricultural Secretary by AMLO, Villalobos Arámbula served as Undersecretary of Natural Resources of the Secretariat of Environment, Natural Resources and Fisheries (SEMARNAP) and as Undersecretary of Agriculture of the Secretariat of Agriculture, Livestock, Rural Development, Fisheries and Food (SAGARPA). In 1998, he was appointed the first Executive Secretary of the Intersecretarial Commission on Biosafety of Genetically Modified Organisms (CIBIOGEM).

From 2010 to 2018, Villalobos was Director General of the Inter-American Institute for Cooperation on Agriculture (IICA) (in English) in Costa Rica.

== Personal life ==
Víctor Manuel Villalobos Arámbula was born in Mexico City, Mexico, in 1950.

== Honors ==
- Member of the Royal Swedish Academy of Agriculture and Forestry since 2004.
- Ad Honorem Professor at the College of Postgraduates and a distinguished student at the Autonomous University of Chapingo.
- Honorary Doctorate from CATIE.
- Honorary Doctorate from the National University of Asunción, Paraguay (2013).
- Honorary Collegiate Member and Honor of Merit "Golden Spike" for his distinguished services to the national agricultural company of the College of Agricultural engineers and Professionals in Agricultural Sciences of Bolivia – CIAB (2015)
- Diploma of agronomic merit for his work in biotechnology applied to agriculture in international organizations (SAGARAPA, 1995).
