= Carlos Alberto García González =

Mexican politician

- Born: 8 July 1971 (age 54); Matamoros, Tamaulipas, Mexico
- Occupation: Politician
- Political party: PAN

Carlos Alberto García González (born 8 July 1971) is a Mexican politician affiliated with the National Action Party (PAN).

A native of Matamoros, Tamaulipas, García González has been elected to the Chamber of Deputies for Tamaulipas's 4th district on two occasions: in the 2006 general election (60th session), and in the 2012 general election (62nd session).
