= Érick Silva Santos =

Mexican politician

Erick Silva Santos
- Born: 13 January 1970 (age 56); Matamoros, Tamaulipas, Mexico
- Occupation: Politician
- Political party: PRI

Érick Agustín Silva Santos (born 13 January 1970) is a Mexican politician affiliated with the Institutional Revolutionary Party (PRI).

== Political career ==
In 2004–2006, during the 59th session of Congress, he served in the Chamber of Deputies as the alternate of Baltazar Hinojosa Ochoa for Tamaulipas's 4th district.

He was the mayor of Matamoros, Tamaulipas, from 2008 to 2010.

== Federal accusations in the U.S. ==
The U.S. Attorney's Office announced on 10 November 2014 that Silva was accused in a federal indictment for money laundering, bank fraud, public fund theft, and other financial charges. According to court documents, Silva transferred the ill funds from Mexico to U.S. banks; it is alleged that he lied about his bank statements and falsified documents.
