= 4th federal electoral district of Tamaulipas =

Federal electoral district of Mexico

Tamaulipas's 4th
- Electoral district of the Chamber of Deputies of Mexico

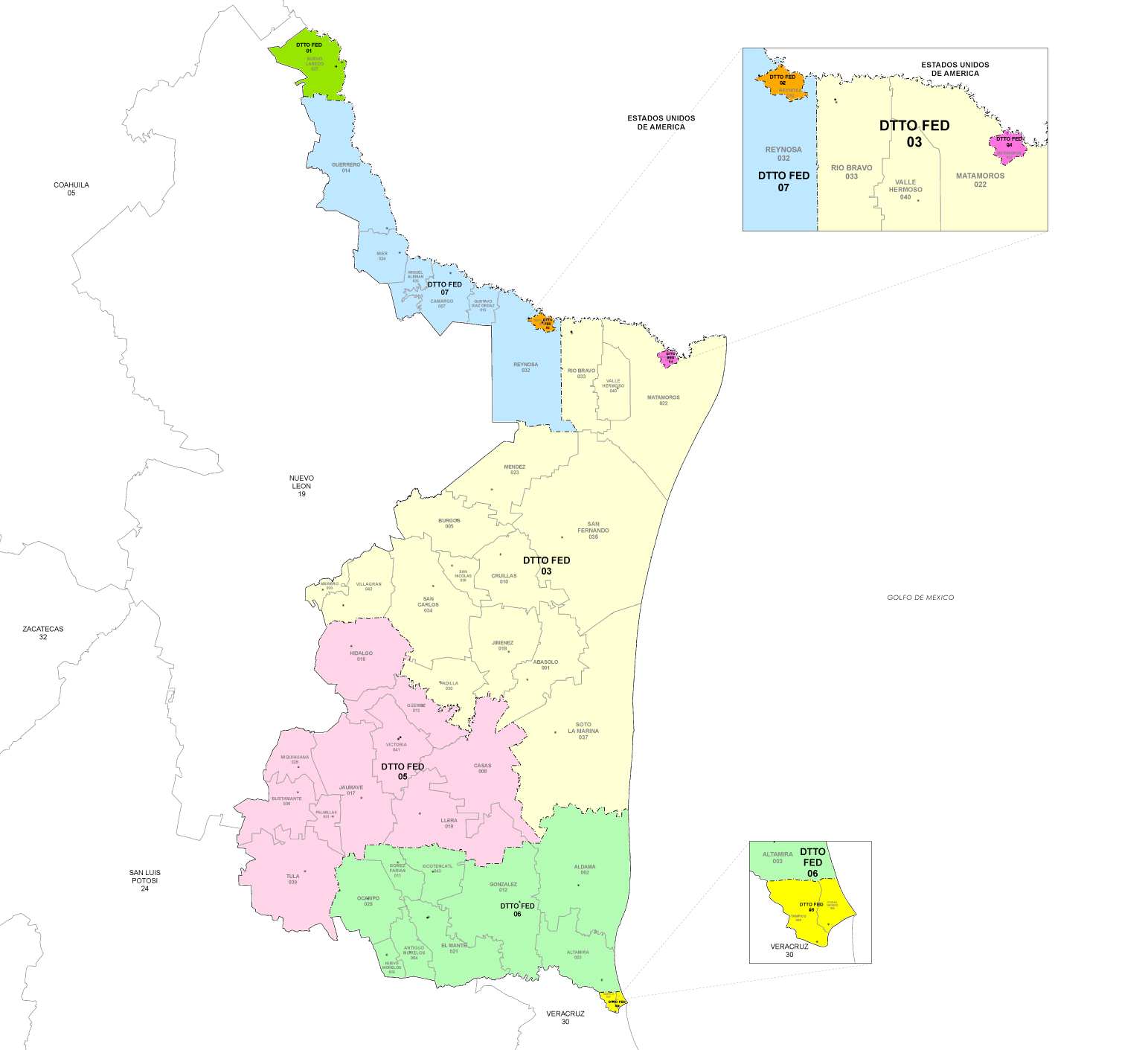
- 4th district since 2023

Incumbent
- Member: Mario Alberto López
- Party: ▌Ecologist Green Party
- Congress: 66th (2024–2027)

District
- State: Tamaulipas
- Head town: Matamoros
- Coordinates: 25°52′N 97°30′W
- Covers: Municipality of Matamoros (part)
- PR region: Second
- Precincts: 197
- Population: 439,075 (2020 census)

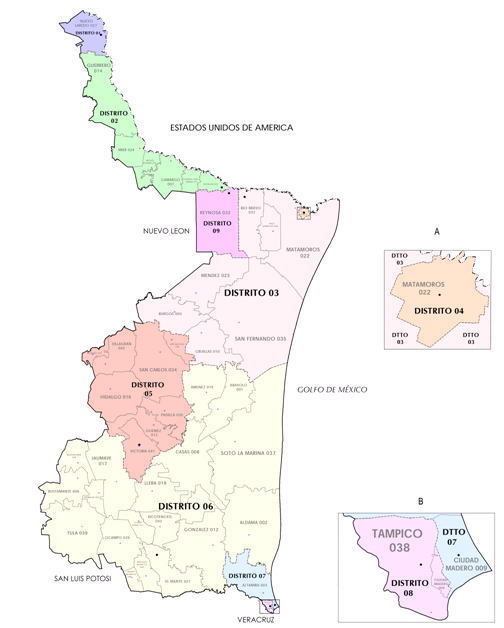
Tamaulipas's districts in 2017–2022

The 4th federal electoral district of Tamaulipas (Spanish: Distrito electoral federal 04 de Tamaulipas) is one of the 300 electoral districts into which Mexico is divided for elections to the federal Chamber of Deputies and one of eight such districts in the state of Tamaulipas.

It elects one deputy to the lower house of Congress for each three-year legislative session by means of the first-past-the-post system. Votes cast in the district also count towards the calculation of proportional representation ("plurinominal") deputies elected from the second region.

The current member for the district, elected in the 2024 general election, is Mario Alberto López Hernández. Originally elected for the National Regeneration Movement (Morena), he switched to the Ecologist Green Party of Mexico (PVEM) at the start of the congressional session.

== District territory ==
Tamaulipas lost a district in the 2023 districting plan adopted by the National Electoral Institute (INE), which is to be used for the 2024, 2027 and 2030 federal elections, but the 4th district was largely unaffected. It is located in the north of the state and comprises 197 electoral precincts (secciones electorales) in the urban core of the municipality of Matamoros.

The head town (cabecera distrital), where results from individual polling stations are gathered together and tallied, is the city of Matamoros. The district reported a population of 439,075 in the 2020 census.

== Previous districting schemes ==
Evolution of electoral district numbers
	1974	1978	1996	2005	2017	2023
Tamaulipas	6	9	8	8	9	8
Chamber of Deputies	196	300				

2017–2022

Between 2017 and 2022, Tamaulipas accounted for nine single-member congressional seats. The 4th district's head town was at Matamoros and it covered 157 precincts in the municipality's urban core.

2005–2017

Under the 2005 plan, Tamaulipas had eight districts. This district's head town was at Matamoros and it covered 173 precincts in the municipality's urban core.

1996–2005

In the 1996 scheme, under which Tamaulipas lost a single-member seat, the district had its head town at Matamoros and it covered the whole of the city and its municipality.

1978–1996

The districting scheme in force from 1978 to 1996 was the result of the 1977 electoral reforms, which increased the number of single-member seats in the Chamber of Deputies from 196 to 300. Under that plan, Tamaulipas's seat allocation rose from six to nine. The 4th district's head town was at the state capital, Ciudad Victoria, and it covered six municipalities in that part of the state:
- Bustamante, Jaumave, Miquihuana, Palmillas, Tula and Victoria.

== Deputies returned to Congress ==
(Mexico) National parties
- Current
- PAN
- PRI
- PT
- PVEM
- MC
- Morena
- PAZ
- Somos
- Defunct or local only
- PLM
- PNR
- PRM
- PNM
- PP
- PPS
- PARM
- PFCRN
- CON
- PANAL
- PSD
- PES
- PES
- PRD

Tamaulipas's 4th district
Election	Deputy	Party	Term	Legislature
1916	Fortunato de Leija		1916–1917	Constituent Congress of Querétaro
1917	Emilio Portes Gil		1917–1918	27th Congress
...
1976	Aurora Cruz de Mora	Institutional Revolutionary Party	1976–1979	50th Congress
1979	Jaime Báez Rodríguez	Institutional Revolutionary Party	1979–1982	51st Congress
1982	Abdón Martínez Hinojosa	Institutional Revolutionary Party	1982–1985	52nd Congress
1985	Diego Navarro Rodríguez	Institutional Revolutionary Party	1985–1988	53rd Congress
1988	Jaime Rodríguez Inurrigarro	Institutional Revolutionary Party	1988–1991	54th Congress
1991	Laura Alicia Garza Galindo	Institutional Revolutionary Party	1991–1994	55th Congress
1994	José Antonio Martínez Torres	Institutional Revolutionary Party	1994–1997	56th Congress
1997	Miguel Antonio Rubiano Reyna	Institutional Revolutionary Party	1997–2000	57th Congress
2000	Simón Iván Villar Martínez	Institutional Revolutionary Party	2000–2003	58th Congress
2003	Baltazar Manuel Hinojosa Ochoa (Note: Hinojosa Ochoa resigned his seat on 13 August 2004 and was replaced for the remainder of his term by his alternate, Silva Santos.); Érick Agustín Silva Santos	Institutional Revolutionary Party	2003–2004; 2004–2006	59th Congress
2006	Carlos Alberto García González	National Action Party (Mexico)	2006–2009	60th Congress
2009	Baltazar Manuel Hinojosa Ochoa	Institutional Revolutionary Party	2009–2012	61st Congress
2012	Carlos Alberto García González	National Action Party (Mexico)	2012–2015	62nd Congress
2015	Jesús de la Garza Díaz del Guante	Institutional Revolutionary Party	2015–2018	63rd Congress
2018	Adriana Lozano Rodríguez	National Regeneration Movement	2018–2021	64th Congress
2021	Adriana Lozano Rodríguez	National Regeneration Movement	2021–2024	65th Congress
2024	Mario Alberto López Hernández (Note: López Hernández was originally elected for Morena but switched to the PVEM at the start of the congressional session.)	National Regeneration Movement Ecologist Green Party of Mexico	2024–2027	66th Congress

== Presidential elections ==
Tamaulipas's 4th district
Election	District won by	Party or coalition	%
2018	Andrés Manuel López Obrador	Juntos Haremos Historia	54.5945
2024	Claudia Sheinbaum Pardo	Sigamos Haciendo Historia	67.9386
