= Javier Usabiaga =

Mexican businessman and politician (1939–2018)

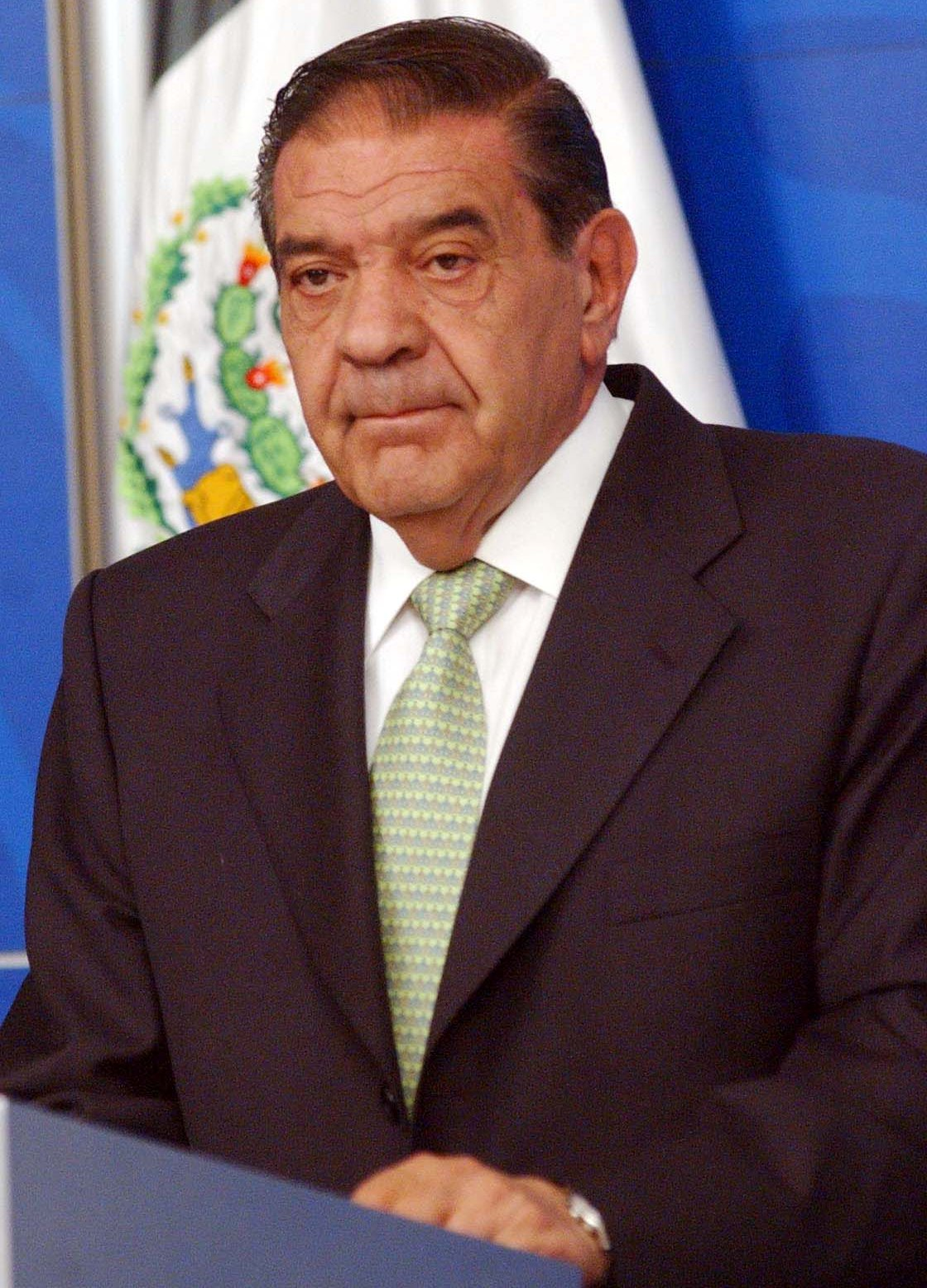

Secretary of Agriculture
- In office 1 December 2000 – 28 September 2005
- President: Vicente Fox
- Preceded by: Romárico Arroyo Marroquín
- Succeeded by: Francisco Mayorga Castañeda

Personal details
- Born: 20 August 1939 Celaya, Guanajuato, Mexico
- Died: 9 September, 2018 (age 79) Mexico City, Mexico
- Party: PAN
- Profession: Businessman and politician

Javier Bernardo Usabiaga Arroyo (20 August 1939 – 9 September 2018) was a Mexican businessman and politician from the National Action Party (PAN). A native of Celaya, Guanajuato, he was a successful farmer in the state and was nicknamed el rey del ajo ("the King of Garlic").

In the 2000 general election, he was elected to the Chamber of Deputies to represent Guanajuato's 12th district during the 58th session of Congress. He resigned his seat on 28 November 2000 to take office as the federal secretary of agriculture in the incoming administration of Vicente Fox and was replaced for the remainder of his term by his alternate, José Rivera Carranza.

He was secretary of agriculture from the start of Fox's government on 1 December 2000 until 28 September 2005, when he was replaced by Francisco Mayorga Castañeda.

He returned to the Chamber of Deputies in the 2009 mid-terms as a plurinominal deputy for the 2nd region.

Javier Usabiaga died in Mexico City on 9 September 2018. He was 79 years old and had been suffering from cancer.

Political offices
Preceded by Romárico Arroyo Marroquín	Secretary of Agriculture; 2000–2005	Succeeded by Francisco Mayorga Castañeda
