= Simón Villar Martínez =

Mexican politician

- Born: 24 December 1957 (age 68); Tamaulipas, Mexico
- Occupation: Politician
- Political party: PRI

Simón Iván Villar Martínez (born 24 December 1957) is a Mexican politician from the Institutional Revolutionary Party (PRI). In the 2000 general election, he was elected to the Chamber of Deputies to represent Tamaulipas's 4th district during the 58th session of Congress.
