= Secretariat of Agriculture and Rural Development =

- Secretaría de Agricultura y Desarrollo Rural
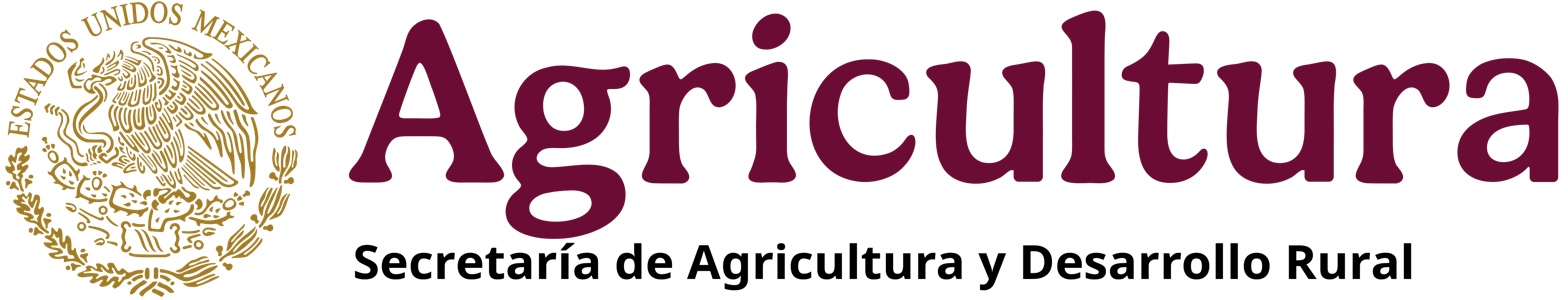
- Official seal and emblem

Agency overview
- Formed: 1842 as General Directorate of Industry
- Preceding agency: Secretariat of Agriculture, Livestock, Rural Development, Fisheries and Food
- Jurisdiction: Federal government of Mexico
- Headquarters: Mexico City
- Employees: 800 (2006)
- Annual budget: US$387 million (2019)
- Agency executive: Columba López Gutiérrez, Secretary
- Website: www.gob.mx/sader

The Secretariat of Agriculture and Rural Development (Spanish: Secretaría de Agricultura y Desarrollo Rural; SADER) is Mexico's agriculture ministry.

== History ==
The secretariat traces its roots to 1917, when it was established as the Secretaría de Agricultura y Fomento (Secretariat of Agriculture and Development). The name changed in 1946 to Secretaría de Agricultura y Ganadería (Secretariat of Agriculture and Ranching), in 1976 to Secretaría de Agricultura y Recursos Hidráulicos (Secretariat of Agriculture and Hydraulic Resources), and again in 1994 to Secretaría de Agricultura, Ganadería y Desarrollo Rural (Secretariat of Agriculture, Ranching and Rural Development).

In 2000, the name changed to the Secretariat of Agriculture, Livestock, Rural Development, Fisheries and Food (Spanish: Secretaría de Agricultura, Ganadería, Desarrollo Rural, Pesca y Alimentación, SAGARPA).

In December 2018, after the inauguration of Andrés Manuel López Obrador as president, SAGARPA became SADER.

== Leadership ==
During the presidency of Enrique Peña Nieto, Enrique Martínez y Martínez served as the initial secretary. He left the post in 2015 to become Mexico's ambassador to Cuba and was replaced by José Eduardo Calzada Rovirosa, the former Governor of Querétaro. Baltazar Hinojosa Ochoa finished out the Peña Nieto sexenio as the head of SAGARPA.

Alberto Cárdenas Jiménez (2006–2009) and Francisco Javier Mayorga Castañeda (2009–2012) were the Agriculture Secretaries under Felipe Calderón. Mayorga Castañeda was also Agriculture Secretary during the administration of Vicente Fox.

== Previous designations ==
Since its creation, the current Secretariat of Agriculture and Rural Development has had the following names:

- (1842–1917): General Directorate of Industry
- (1917–1946): Ministry of Agriculture and Development
- (1946–1976): Secretariat of Agriculture and Livestock (SAG).
- (1976–1994): Secretariat of Agriculture and Hydraulic Resources (SARH).
- (1994–2000): Secretariat of Agriculture, Livestock and Rural Development (SAGAR).
- (2000–2018): Secretariat of Agriculture, Livestock, Rural Development, Fisheries and Food (SAGARPA).

== List of secretaries ==
=== Ministry of Agriculture and Development ===
- Government of Venustiano Carranza (1917–1920)
  - (1917–1920): Pastor Rouaix
- Government of Adolfo de la Huerta (1920)
  - (1920): Antonio I. Villarreal
- Government of Álvaro Obregón (1920–1924)
  - (1920–1924): Antonio I. Villarreal
  - (1924): Ramón P. de Negri
- Government of Plutarco Elías Calles (1924–1928)
  - (1924–1928): Luis L. León
- Government of Emilio Portes Gil (1928–1930)
  - (1928–1930): Marte R. Gómez
- Government of Pascual Ortiz Rubio (1930–1932)
  - (1930–1931): Manuel Pérez Treviño
  - (1931): Saturnino Cedillo
  - (1931–1932): Francisco S. Elías
- Government of Abelardo L. Rodríguez (1932–1934)
  - (1932–1934): Francisco S. Elías
- Government of Lázaro Cárdenas del Río (1934–1940)
  - (1934–1935): Tomás Garrido Canabal
  - (1935–1937): Saturnino Cedillo
  - (1937–1940): José E. Parrés
- Government of Manuel Ávila Camacho (1940–1946)
  - (1940–1946): Marte R. Gómez

=== Secretariat of Agriculture and Livestock ===
- Government of Miguel Alemán Valdés (1946–1952)
  - (1946–1952): Nazario S. Ortiz Garza
- Government of Adolfo Ruiz Cortines (1952–1958)
  - (1952–1958): Gilberto Flores Muñoz
- Government of Adolfo López Mateos (1958–1964)
  - (1958–1964): Julián Rodríguez Adame
- Government of Gustavo Díaz Ordaz (1964–1970)
  - (1964–1970): Juan Gil Preciado
  - (1970): Manuel Bernardo Aguirre
- Government of Luis Echeverría (1970–1976)
  - (1970–1974): Manuel Bernardo Aguirre
  - (1974–1976): Óscar Brauer Herrera

=== Secretariat of Agriculture and Hydraulic Resources ===
- Government of José López Portillo (1976–1982)
  - (1976–1982): Francisco Merino Rábago
- Government of Miguel de la Madrid (1982–1988)
  - (1982–1984): Horacio García Aguilar
  - (1984–1988): Eduardo Pesqueira Olea
- Government of Carlos Salinas de Gortari (1988–1994)
  - (1988–1990): Jorge de la Vega Domínguez
  - (1990–1994): Carlos Hank González

=== Secretariat of Agriculture, Livestock and Rural Development ===
- Government of Ernesto Zedillo (1994–2000)
  - (1994–1995): Arturo Warman Gryj
  - (1995–1998): Francisco Labastida Ochoa
  - (1998–2000): Romárico Arroyo Marroquín

=== Secretariat of Agriculture, Livestock, Rural Development, Fisheries and Food ===
- Government of Vicente Fox (2000–2006)
  - (2000–2005): Javier Usabiaga Arroyo
  - (2005–2006): Francisco Mayorga Castañeda
- Government of Felipe Calderón Hinojosa (2006–2012)
  - (2006–2009): Alberto Cárdenas Jiménez
  - (2009–2012): Francisco Mayorga Castañeda
- Government of Enrique Peña Nieto (2012–2018)
  - (2012–2015): Enrique Martínez y Martínez
  - (2015–2018): José Calzada Rovirosa
  - (2018): Baltazar Hinojosa Ochoa

=== Secretatiat of Agriculture and Rural Development ===
- Government of Andres Manuel López Obrador (2018–2024)
  - (2018–2024): Victor Villalobos Arámbula
- Government of Claudia Sheinbaum (2024–present)
  - (2024–2026): Julio Berdegué Sacristán
  - (2026–present): Columba López Gutiérrez

== Programs ==
- Plant Health (Sanidad Vegetal) – Prevention, surveillance, control, and eradication of plant pests.
