= Baltazar Hinojosa Ochoa =

Mexican-American politician

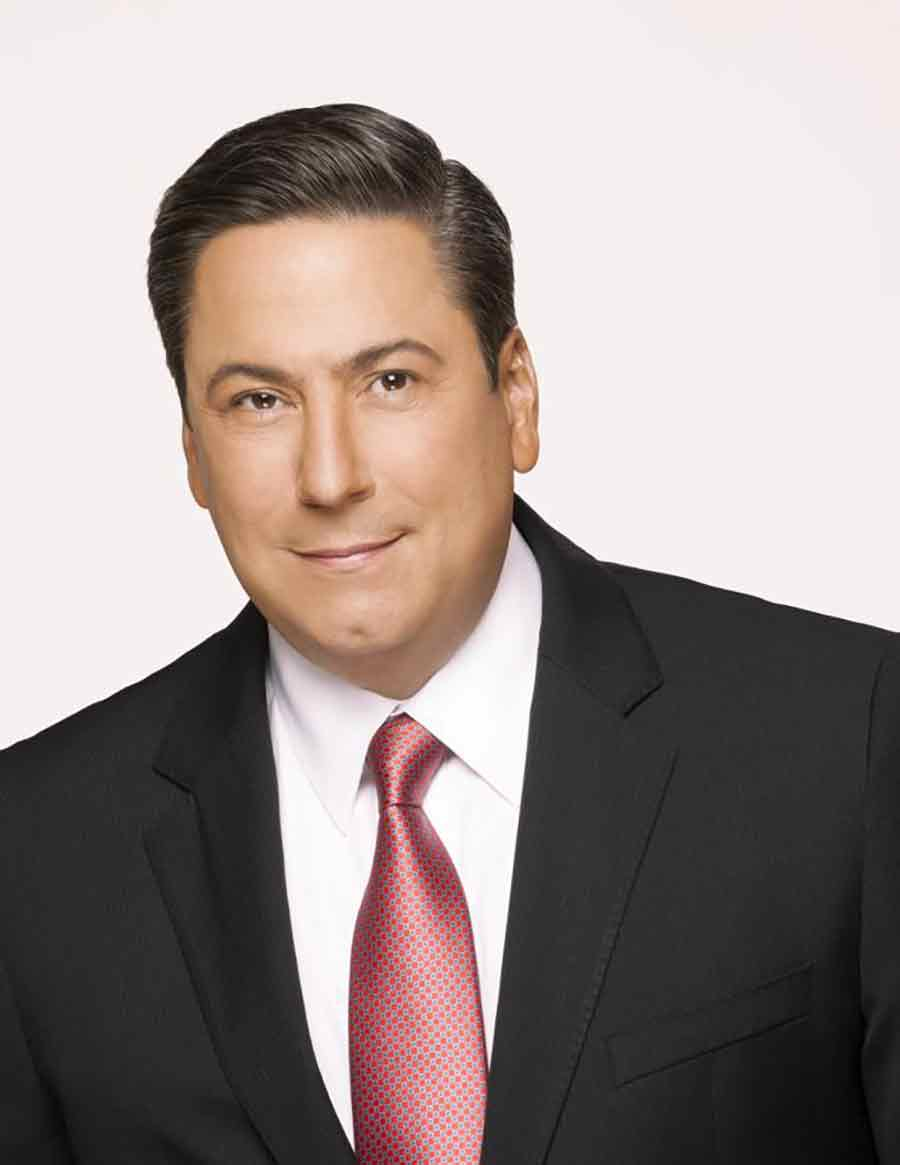

Secretary of Agriculture, Livestock, Rural Development, Fisheries and Food
- In office 4 April 2018 – 30 November 2018
- President: Enrique Peña Nieto
- Preceded by: José Calzada Rovirosa
- Succeeded by: Víctor Villalobos

Personal details
- Born: Baltazar Manuel Hinojosa Ochoa; September 13, 1963 (age 62) Brownsville, Texas, U.S.
- Party: Institutional Revolutionary Party
- Education: Bachelor's degree
- Alma mater: Universidad de Monterrey
- Website: baltazarhinojosa.com

Baltazar Manuel Hinojosa Ochoa (born September 13, 1963) is a Mexican-American politician from the Institutional Revolutionary Party (PRI) and former Secretary of Agriculture, Livestock, Rural Development, Fisheries and Food. He holds a bachelor's degree in economics from the Universidad de Monterrey.

== Political career ==
Hinojosa joined the PRI in 1981 and was a member of its National Political Council and the Standing Political Commission. He also was a member of the PRI's Political State Council in Tamaulipas and Municipal Political Advisor in Matamoros.

He was also the General Director of the League of Revolutionary Economists Trust of the Mexican Republic (LER, by its Spanish acronym), as well as its finance secretary and regional coordination deputy secretary for Northern Mexico.

After receiving his degree, in his first public position, he was advisor at the General Office of Documentation, Analysis, and Evaluation of the Secretariat of Programming and Budgeting. There, he served as advisor and spokesman for the Undersecretary of Development Planning's Political Economy Information Program, where he also served as head of department at the Planning Coordination Office.

In 1985, he taught a macroeconomics course and a seminar entitled "Mexico’s Economic, Political, and Social Problems", at the Universidad Anáhuac.

Later, he was head of the Department of Budget and Income in the office of the president of the National Institute of Statistics and Geography (INEGI, by its Spanish acronym). He was also its deputy budget director and private secretary to the president.

In 1988, Hinojosa coordinated advisors to the Presidency of the Programming and Budgeting Commission for the first session period of the LIV Legislature of the Mexican Congress. Later, in DICONSA-CONASUPO, he served as Commercial Modernization deputy manager.

From 1994 to 1996, he was a Federal Delegate of the SEDESOL in Coahuila, and also served as Technical Secretary of the State Development Planning Committee (COPLADEC, by its Spanish acronym). In 1997, he became the state's Expenditure Deputy Secretary at the Finance Department of the State of Coahuila, where he remained until 1999. During these years, he was also a member of the Coahuila Banobras Board of Directors.

From April to December 2000, he served as Social Development Secretary for the Government of Tamaulipas, and in 2001, he rejoined the state cabinet as Secretary of Education, Culture, and Sports, a post he held until February 2003.

=== 2018 Secretary of Agriculture, Livestock, Rural Development, Fisheries and Food. ===
On April 4, 2018, President Enrique Peña Nieto appointed Baltazar Hinojosa Ochoa Secretary of Agriculture, Livestock, Rural Development, Fisheries and Food.

=== 2016 gubernatorial campaign ===
As of January 27, 2016, Hinojosa Ochoa took leave from the Chamber of Deputies, as the PRI candidate for the Tamaulipas governorship. Hinojosa Ochoa picked up 36 percent of the vote.

=== Return to the Chamber of Deputies ===
As part of the PRI proportional representation list for the LXIII Legislature, he returned to the Chamber of Deputies for the third time. Between September 2015 and January 2016, he was the president of the Budget and Public Accounts Commission, and also served on the Finances and Public Credit Commission.

=== PRI National Executive Committee Organization Secretary ===
On April 23, 2015, he was named Organization Secretary for the PRI National Executive Committee.

=== ASERCA Director in Chief ===
On December 10, 2012, the then SAGARPA secretary, Enrique Martínez y Martínez, and upon instructions by President Enrique Peña Nieto, Baltazar Hinojosa was appointed Director in Chief of the Service Agency for the Trading and Development of the Fisheries and Agricultural Markets (ASERCA, by its Spanish acronym), a decentralized SAGARPA subsidiary. He left ASERCA on February 28, 2015.

=== Mayor of Matamoros ===
In late 2004, Hinojosa was elected as the mayor of Matamoros, Tamaulipas from 2005 to 2007. His administration focused on strengthening urban infrastructure and sustainable development, improving the city's image, consolidating cultural institutions, supporting education, and fostering economic development.

During his administration, President Vicente Fox granted him the 2006 Habitat Award, for the design and operation of the Matamoros Regional Sanitary Landfill, evaluated and assessed by the Centro de Investigación y Docencia Económica (CIDE, by its Spanish acronym).

Among his many accomplishments, the public municipal debt was fully paid in 2007. That same year, along with the mayor of Brownsville, Texas, he was named as a Distinguished Border Leader, an award received in Washington, D.C., from Speaker Nancy Pelosi.

=== Federal deputy ===
He was elected as federal deputy for the Fourth Federal Electoral District of Tamaulipas, in the LIX (2003-2004) and LXI (2009-2011) Legislatures, and received a special award, from then Secretary of Public Education, Dr. Reyes Tamez Guerra, during the VIII National Meeting of Education Authorities, held in San Luis Potosi, in April 2003.

In the LIX Legislature, Hinojosa sat on the Budgeting and Public Account Commission, as well as the Finance and Public Credit Commission and the Special Commission for the Burgos Region Basin. He actively participated in the integration of the Federation Expenditure Budget decrees, which included important measures to enhance transparency and efficiency in public spending, more government spending austerity, and federalism. During his term, more resources were allocated to the fisheries and agriculture sector, as well as to road and highway infrastructure. In April 2004, he formulated and presented in Congress the bill for a new Federal Budget Law, which served as the basis for the enactment of the current Budget and Finance Responsibility Federal Law.

In the LXI Legislature, he sat on the same commissions as in the LIX Legislature, and on the Committee for the Public Finances Study Center. He also served as president of the Mexico-UK and Mexico-Cuba Friendship Groups of the Chamber of Deputies, and head of the Tamaulipas PRI delegation.

==== Third Constitutional Article Reform and the Compulsory Middle-Higher Education ====
In April 2010, he submitted a bill to reform Constitutional Article 3, to make Middle-Higher Education compulsory nationwide. It was unanimously passed by both chambers and enacted in February 2012.
