= Alberto Cárdenas =

Mexican politician

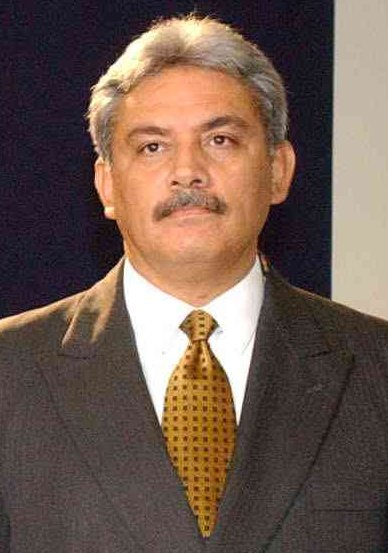
Alberto Cárdenas

Alberto Cárdenas Jiménez (born April 4, 1958) is a Mexican politician affiliated with the conservative National Action Party (PAN). He is a former governor of Jalisco, (1995 – 2001). And Secretary of Agriculture in the cabinet of Felipe Calderón (1 December 2006 – 7 September 2009). In 2006 he was elected to the Senate for PAN, representing the state of Jalisco, with his term running until 2012.

Cárdenas was born in Zapotlán el Grande, Jalisco. He received a bachelor's degree in Industrial Engineering from the Ciudad Guzmán Institute of Technology and both a master's degree in Business Planning and Ph.D. in Industrial Engineering from the Polytechnical University of Madrid, in Spain.

He was the mayor of Ciudad Guzmán from 1992 until 1994 and served as governor of Jalisco from 1995 until 2001. After leaving the post he was appointed general director of the National Forestry Commission. From 2003 until 2005 he headed the Secretariat of Environment and Natural Resources in the cabinet of Vicente Fox.

On July 7, 2005, he was formally registered in the presidential primary election of the National Action Party. He competed for the nomination with former fellow cabinet members Santiago Creel and Felipe Calderón, but ultimately lost to Calderón. In the general election of July 2, 2006, he was elected to the Senate for the PAN, representing the state of Jalisco.

Cárdenas is married to Joann Novoa Mossberger and has three children: Andrea, Alberto and Álvaro.

== See also ==
- Governor of Jalisco
- Cabinet of Alberto Cárdenas Jiménez
