= Región Norte, Jalisco =

Norte Region
- Region
- #1-Norte Region
- Country: Mexico
- State: Jalisco
- Largest city: Colotlán

Area
  - Total: 10,403 km^{2} (4,017 sq mi)

Population (2020)
  - Total: 84,335
- Time zone: UTC−6 (CST)

The Norte region is one of the regions of the Mexican state of Jalisco. It is part of the coastal region of Jalisco, comprising 10 municipalities with a population of 84,335 as of 2020.

== Municipalities ==
Municipality code	Name	Population		Land Area			Population density	
Municipality code	Name	2020	Rank	km^{2}	sq mi	Rank	2020	Rank
019	Bolaños	7,043	4	1,301	502	3	5/km^{2} (14/sq mi)	8
031	Chimaltitán	3,270	9	765	295	5	4/km^{2} (11/sq mi)	9
025	Colotlán	19,689	2	685	264	6	29/km^{2} (74/sq mi)	1
041	Huejúcar	5,920	5	498	192	9	12/km^{2} (31/sq mi)	3
042	Huejuquilla el Alto	10,015	3	804	310	4	12/km^{2} (32/sq mi)	2
061	Mezquitic	22,083	1	2,892	1,117	1	8/km^{2} (20/sq mi)	7
076	San Martín de Bolaños	3,095	10	1,980	760	2	2/km^{2} (4/sq mi)	10
081	Santa María de los Ángeles	3,515	8	313	121	10	11/km^{2} (29/sq mi)	4
104	Totatiche	4,180	7	555	214	8	8/km^{2} (20/sq mi)	6
115	Villa Guerrero	5,525	6	610	240	7	9/km^{2} (23/sq mi)	5
	Norte Region	84,335	—	10,403	4,016.62	—	8/km^{2} (21/sq mi)	—
Source: INEGI

=== Largest cities ===
Largest cities or towns in Norte Region Source:
Rank		Municipality	Pop.
1	Colotlán	Colotlán	15,129
2	Huejuquilla el Alto	Huejuquilla el Alto	5,949
3	Villa Guerrero	Villa Guerrero	4,023
4	Huejúcar	Huejúcar	3,762
5	Mezquitic	Mezquitic	2,639
6	San Martín de Bolaños	San Martín de Bolaños	2,138
7	San Andrés Cohiamata	Mezquitic	1,676
8	Temastián	Totatiche	1,477
9	Tuxpan de Bolaños	Bolaños	1,355
10	Totatiche	Totatiche	1,338
