= Bolaños =

Bolaños may refer to:

== Places ==
- Bolaños, Jalisco, in town in Mexico.
- Bolaños Municipality, in Mexico.
- Bolaños River, in Mexico
- Bolaños de Calatrava, a city in Spain
- Bolaños de Campos, a municipality in Spain
- Tobías Bolaños International Airport, in Costa Rica

== Other uses ==
- Bolaños (surname)
- Bolaños Woodrat (family Cricetidae), a species of rodent in Mexico
- Ycuá Bolaños supermarket fire (2004), in Asunción, Paraguay

== See also ==
- Bolaño (disambiguation)
- Bolanos (disambiguation)
