= Bolanos =

Bolanos may refer to:

- Bolanos River, island of Guam
- Mount Bolanos (368 m or 1,207 ft), near Umatac, island of Guam

Or to:

- Bolaños River, in Mexico
- Bolaños Municipality, a municipality in Mexico

== See also ==
- Bolaños (disambiguation)
