= Azqueltán =

Coordinates: 22°02.46′N 103°44.168′W

Azqueltán is a small settlement located on the banks of the Bolaños River in the municipality of Villa Guerrero, Jalisco, Mexico. "Azqueltán" (reduced from earlier "Atzqueltlán") means "land of many ants" in the Tepehuán language.

According to John Alden Mason, the village was originally settled by a group of indigenous Tepehuán who migrated to the isolated canyon location in the 13th or 14th Century AD following droughts in the northern Sierra Madre Occidental and Arizona during that time. In 1534, Spaniards arrived in the area and Huichol groups settled in the surrounding areas, most likely as a result of Spanish incursion into their homelands to the east.

In the eighteenth century, historically Tepehuán lands outside of the river-canyon were taken over by Spaniards and Tlaxcaltecs brought to the region as colonizers by the Spaniards. While other historically Tepehuán settlements in the region, such as Totatiche and Temastián, lost their Tepehuán identity due to migration of the Spanish and Tlaxcaltecs, inhabitants of Azqueltán, isolated in the river-canyon, maintained their Tepehuán identity and language through the beginning of the 20th century.

Traditionally, the people of Azqueltán and the divergent dialect of Southern Tepehuán once spoken at Azqueltán have been referred to as Tepecano. The Tepecano language was studied during the period 1911-13 by Mason, and in 1965 and 1979-80 by Dennis Holt.

In more recent years, some Huichol inhabitants from the area west of the Sierra Madre Occidental have settled in the village.
