= Cristóbal Magallanes =

Mexican Catholic priest, martyr and saint (1869–1927)

Saint Cristóbal Magallanes
- Martyr
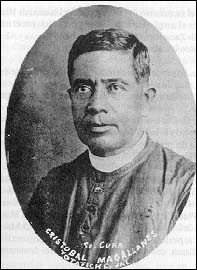
- Church: Catholic

Orders
- Ordination: 1899

Personal details
- Born: Cristóbal Magallanes Jara; July 30, 1869 San Rafael,Totatiche, Jalisco, Mexico
- Died: May 25, 1927 (aged 57) Colotlán, Jalisco, Mexico

Sainthood
- Feast day: May 21
- Venerated in: Catholic Church
- Title as Saint: Martyr
- Beatified: November 22, 1992 by Pope John Paul II
- Canonized: May 21, 2000 by Pope John Paul II
- Attributes: Cassock, sacerdotal vestments, Bible, rosary, and palm of martyrdom
- Patronage: Cancer

Cristóbal Magallanes Jara (anglicized as Christopher Magallanes; July 30, 1869 – May 25, 1927) was a Mexican Catholic priest and martyr who was killed without trial on the way to say Mass during the Cristero War. He had faced trumped-up charges of inciting rebellion.

== Early life ==
The Baptism of Cristobal Magallanes Jara; he was baptized on August 7th, 1869.

Cristóbal Magallanes Jara was born in San Rafael, Totatiche, Jalisco, Mexico on July 30, 1869. He was son of Rafael Magallanes Romero and Clara Jara Sanchez, who were farmers. He worked as a shepherd in his youth and enrolled in the Conciliar Seminary of San José in Guadalajara at the age of 19.

== Ordination and priestly life ==
Cristóbal was ordained at the age of 30 at Santa Teresa in Guadalajara in 1899 and served as chaplain of the School of Arts and Works of the Holy Spirit in Guadalajara. He was then designated as the parish priest for his hometown of Totatiche, where he helped found schools and carpentry shops and assisted in planning for hydrological works, including the dam of La Candelaria. He took special interest in the evangelization of the local indigenous Huichol people and was instrumental in the foundation of the mission in the indigenous town of Azqueltán.

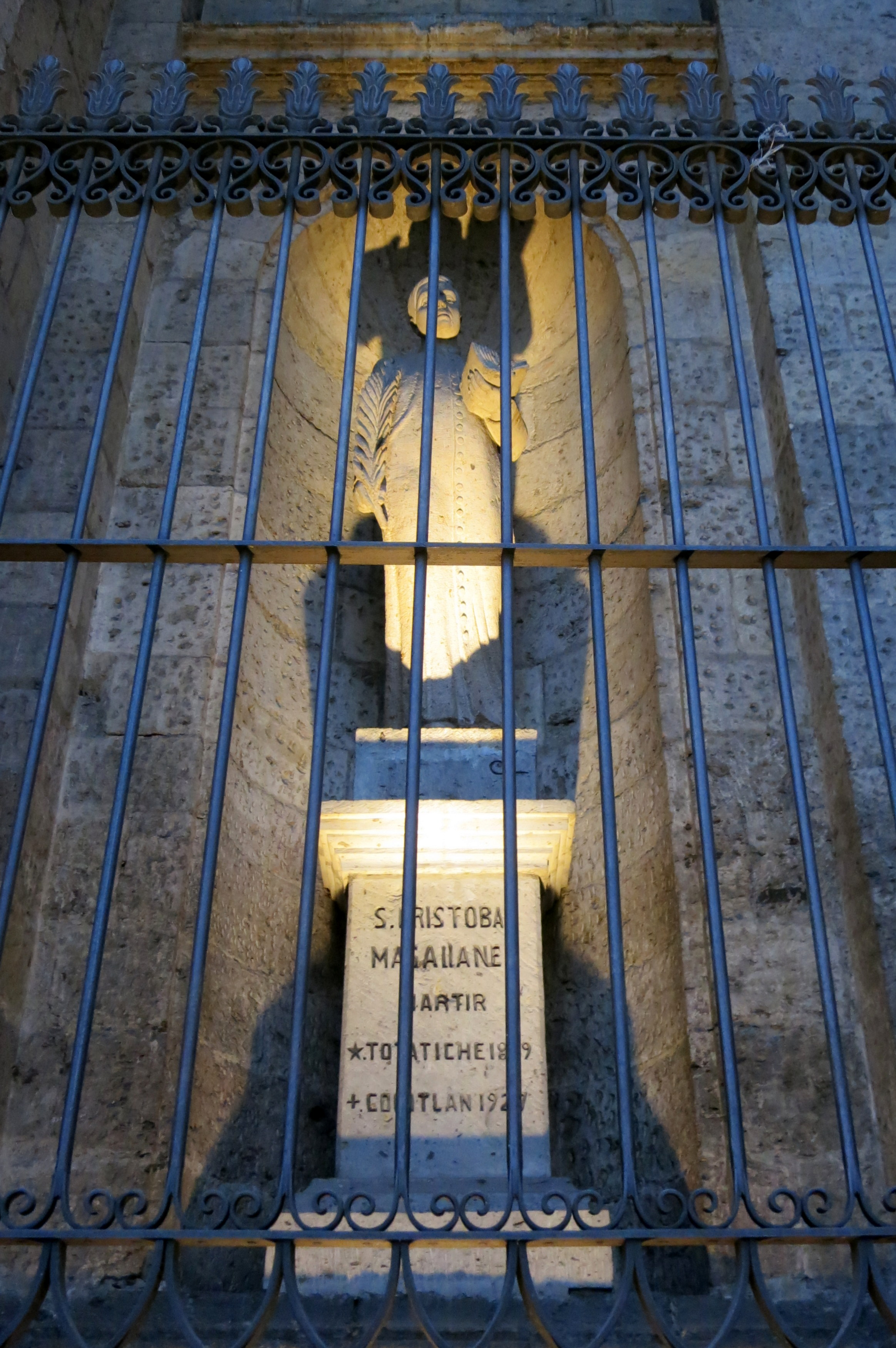
A statue of Cristóbal Magallanes Jara on the exterior of Catedral de la Asunción de María Santísima in Guadalajara.

When government decrees closed the seminary in Guadalajara in 1914, Magallanes offered to open a clandestine seminary in his parish. In July 1915, he opened the Auxiliary Seminary of Totatiche, which achieved a student body of 17 students by the following year and was recognized by the Archbishop of Guadalajara, José Francisco Orozco y Jiménez, who appointed a precept and two professors to the seminary.

== Death ==
Magallanes wrote and preached against armed rebellion, but was falsely accused of promoting the Cristero Rebellion in the area. Arrested on May 21, 1927, while en route to celebrate Mass at a farm, he gave away his few remaining possessions to his executioners, gave them absolution, and without a trial, he was killed four days later with Agustín Caloca in Colotlán, Jalisco. His last words to his executioners were "I die innocent, and ask God that my blood may serve to unite my Mexican brethren."

== Legacy ==
Christopher Magallanes was canonized by Pope John Paul II on May 21, 2000. His annual liturgical celebration in the Latin Catholic Church is assigned as an optional memorial to 21 May.

The concluding sequence of the movie For Greater Glory (2012) says that the fictional character "Father Christopher" portrayed by actor Peter O'Toole was based on Cristobal Magallanes Jara.

== Agustín Caloca Cortés ==
Agustín Caloca Cortés
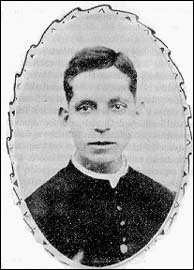
- Agustin Caloca Cortés

Martyr
- Born: May 5, 1898; El Teúl, Zacatecas, Mexico
- Died: May 25, 1927 (aged 29); Colotlán, Jalisco, Mexico
- Venerated in: Catholic Church
- Canonized: May 21, 2000 by Pope John Paul II
- Major shrine: San Juan Bautista del Teúl Parish, Zacatecas, Mexico
- Feast: May 21

Agustín Caloca Cortés (May 5, 1898 – May 25, 1927) was one of the martyrs of Mexico during the Cristero War. Cortés was canonized on May 21, 2000, as part of a group referred to as "Cristóbal Magallanes Jara and 19 companions".

=== Life ===
Agustin Caloca Cortés was born in San Juan Bautista del Teúl, Zacatecas, on the ranch of La Presa. His parents, Eduwiges and María Plutarca Cortés Caloca, were simple peasants. He began his priestly studies at the Guadalajara Seminary, but in 1914 this campus was closed due to the anticlericalism of the Carrancista leaders. He then went to the Auxiliary Seminary of Our Lady of Guadalupe in Totatiche established by the priest Cristóbal Magallanes Jara. In 1919 he re-entered the Guadalajara Seminary to study Theology. He was ordained on August 5, 1923, in the Cathedral Church of Guadalajara.

At Fr Magallanes' request, Cortés was assigned as a parish priest and as prefect of the auxiliary seminary. In December 1926 he had to flee with eleven fifth year seminarians to Cocoatzco, where he remained until April 1927. In May 1927, he arrived at the seminary to announce that Mexican government soldiers were approaching Totatiche. He instructed the seminarians to abandon the seminary and disperse among the town's population. After helping their escape, he himself was taken prisoner and transported to a jail in Colotlán where he was reunited with Fr Magallanes. He was reportedly offered his freedom by an army officer on account of his young age, but refused unless his fellow priest Fr Magallanes was also released.

His last words before execution by firing squad were, "We live for God and for Him we die."

He was originally buried in Colotlán but his remains were later exhumed and transferred to his home parish of San Juan Bautista in El Teúl.
