= Santa Lucía de la Sierra =

Town in the Valparaíso Municipality, Zacatecas

- Town
- Nicknames: Spanish: Santa Lucía; La Sierra (English: St. Lucia; The Sierra)
- Location within Zacatecas Location within Mexico
- Coordinates: 22.470149°N 104.216075°W
- Country: Mexico
- State: Zacatecas
- Elevation: 2,252 m (7,388 ft)

Population (2020)
  - Total: 891
- Time zone: UTC−6 (CST)
  - Summer (DST): UTC−5 (CDT)
- Postal code: 99245

Santa Lucía de la Sierra, nicknamed Santa Lucía or La Sierra, is a community south of the Valparaíso Municipality, Zacatecas, located near the border between the Mexican States of Jalisco and Zacatecas.

It is located 81 km from Huejuquilla El Alto, Jalisco and 123 km from Valparaíso, it had a population of 891 inhabitants during the 2020 Mexico Census.
