= Colotlán =

- Municipality and town
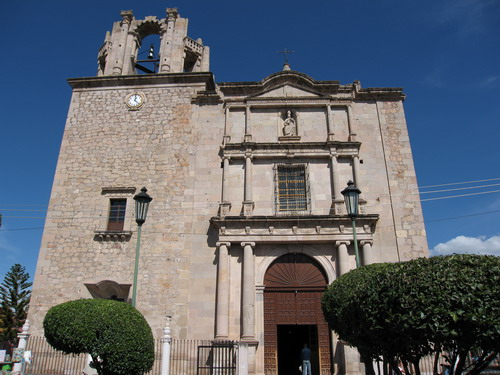

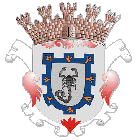
- Coat of arms

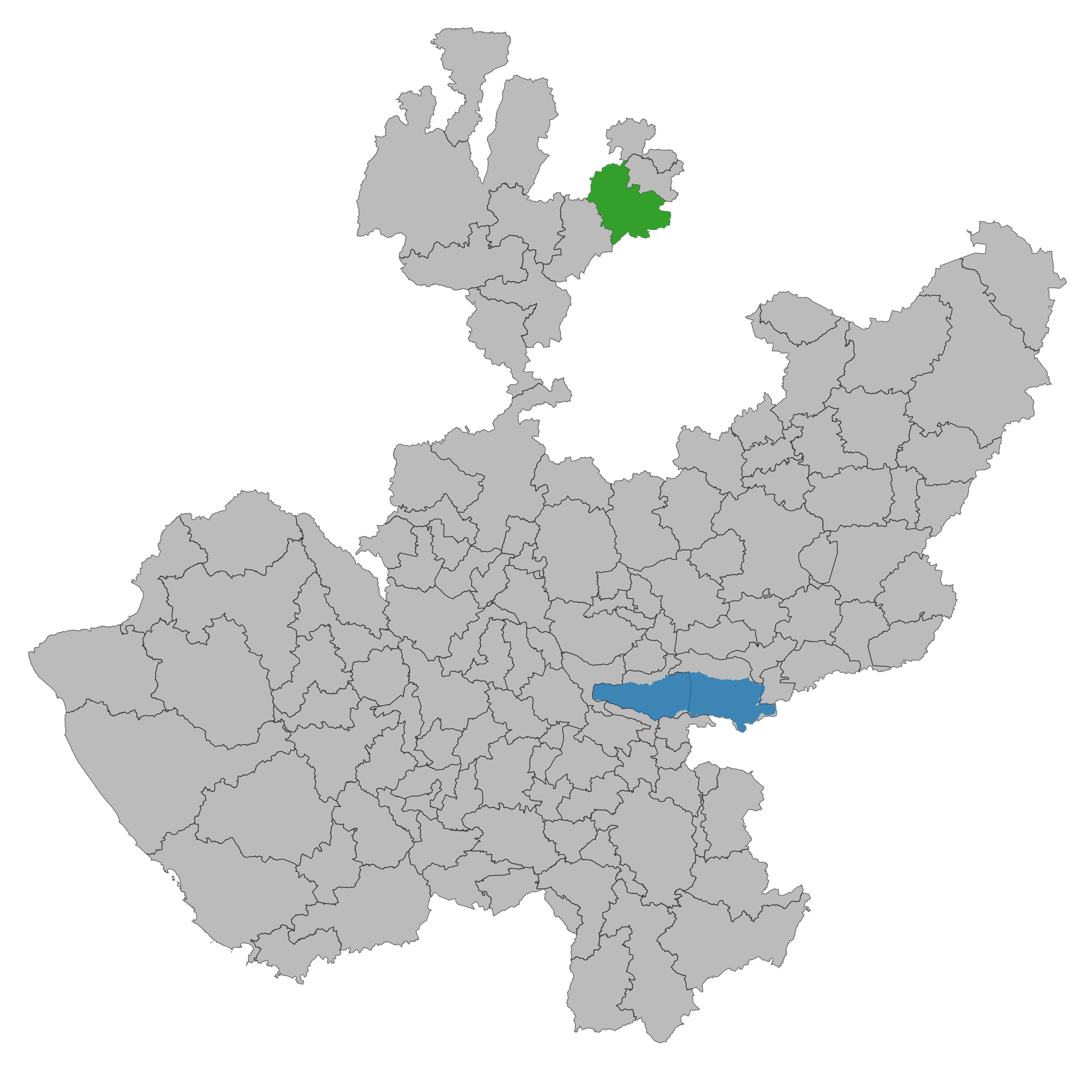
- Municipality location in Jalisco

- Location in Mexico Colotlán (Mexico)
- Coordinates: 22°12′N 103°18′W
- Country: Mexico
- State: Jalisco

Area
  - Total: 648.1 km^{2} (250.2 sq mi)
  - Town: 5.45 km^{2} (2.10 sq mi)
- Elevation: 1,550 m (5,090 ft)

Population (2020 census)
  - Total: 19,689
  - Density: 30.38/km^{2} (78.68/sq mi)
  - Town: 15,129
  - Town density: 2,780/km^{2} (7,190/sq mi)
- Time zone: UTC-6 (Central (US Central))

The municipality of Colotlán is in the northern extremity of the Mexican state of Jalisco. The municipality covers an area of approximately 648 square kilometers. Colotlán is located at 22°12′N 103°18′W. It stands at 1,550 metres (5,090 ft) above sea level.

Colotlán is bordered on the northeast by the municipality of Santa María de los Ángeles, on the northwest and southeast by the state of Zacatecas and to the southwest by the municipality of Totatiche.

== Population ==
The population of the municipality of Colotlán in 2000 totaled 14,266. Of these, 12,283 lived in the municipal seat of Colotlán and the remainder lived in surrounding rural areas. The main villages in the Municipality (known in the region as "Ranchos") are: El Refugio, El Saucillo De Los Pérez, El Carrizal, El Epazote, Los Veliz, Agua Gorda.

Colotlán had a total of 6,008 economically active individuals in 2000. The manufacturing sector employs the largest percentage of this population (30.6 percent) followed by the wholesale and retail sectors (13.6 percent) and agriculture and ranching (12.0 percent).

The municipality is the origin and an important center of piteado manufacturing.

== History ==
=== Pre-Hispanic ===
The name Colotlán means "the place of scorpions" in Nahuatl. Before the Spanish conquest, the area surrounding present-day Colotlán was inhabited by indigenous ethnic groups including the Tepecano, Guachichil and Zacatec (largely nomadic groups collectively referred to by the Mexica and later the Spanish as Chichimecs). These groups were continuously at war with the Caxcan who inhabited the surrounding areas.

=== Colonial ===
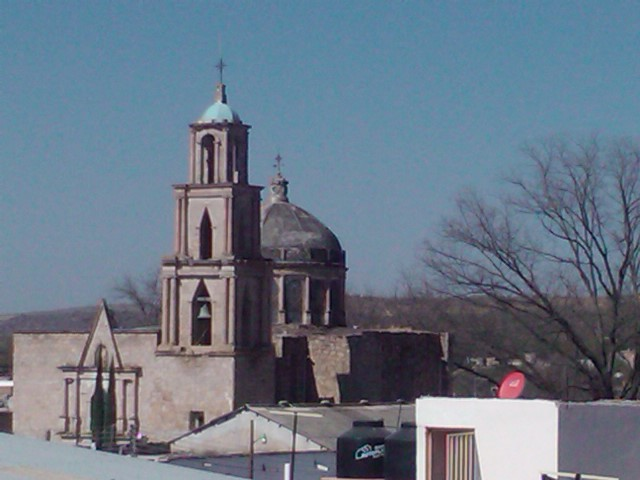
Temple of San Nicolás

The first Spaniards to set foot in the region were soldiers under the command of Captain Pedro Almíndez Chirino in 1530, who reported that the area was largely uninhabited. The atrocities committed by the expeditions sent by Nuño Beltrán de Guzmán led to an area chieftain by the name of Zacatecas to align various indigenous groups in the area to resist the Spanish incursion in the Mixtón War in 1540.

In 1546, the governor of Nueva Galicia, Cristóbal de Oñate sent Juan de Tolosa, who was successful in convincing the indigenous groups to accept Spanish military presence and evangelization by lavishing their leaders with gifts.

The first Spanish settlement was established by Lucas Tellez, who founded the Tochopa Hacienda. Along with Diego Ramírez, they sought permission from the viceroy Luís de Velasco to found a village. The village was initially populated by part of the 400 Tlaxcaltec families sent to this and other regions in the Chichimeca. The Spanish had negotiated with Tlaxaltec leaders to send families to regions where they had been unsuccessful in subjugating the local indigenous groups. The Tlaxcaltecs, who had allied themselves with the Spanish in the conquest of Tenochtitlan were to serve as models of civility and of sedentary agricultural life for the still indominitable Chichimecs of the region.

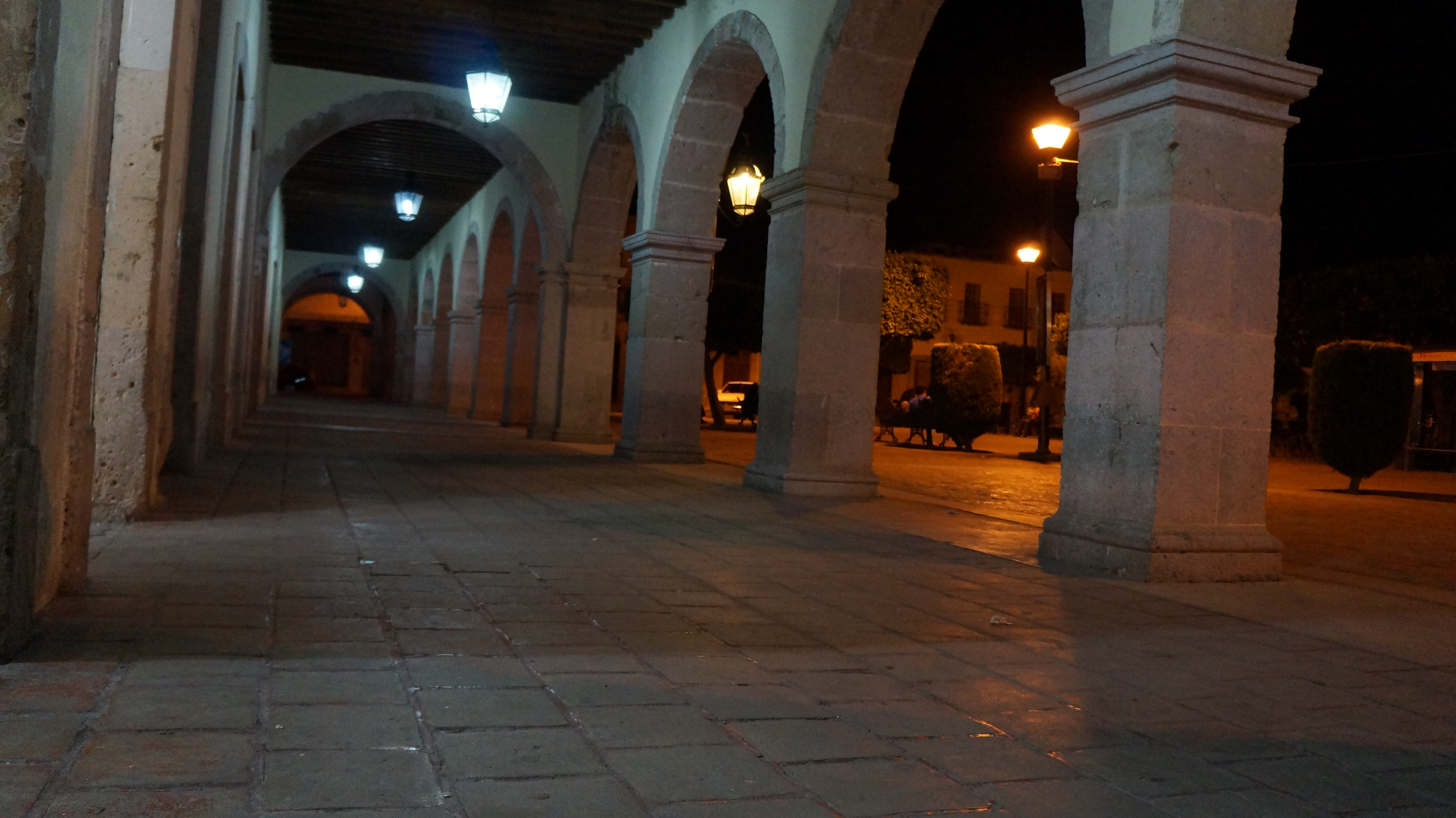
Portal (architecture) of colotlan

On August 21, 1591, Captain Miguel Caldera, mayor of the village of Jerez and the Valley of Tlaltenango, gave the necessary land to establish a settlement. The land was put under the custody of Fray Ignacio Cárdenas, who named the village Villa de Nueva Tlaxcala de Quiahuistlán, a name by which Colotlan was known until the end of the 18th century.

The village was divided into three sectors. The first, Tlaxcala, corresponded to the Tlaxcaltecs as well as the few Spaniards who inhabited the village initially. The second, Sayotlan, was home to the local indigenous inhabitants who had been pacified. The third sector, Tochopa, named after the hacienda that had existed before the town was founded, was for immigrant indigenous groups.

While initially under the rule of the government of Nueva Galicia, the cost and logistics of suppressing the indigenous uprisings in the surrounding areas in the 18th century led the colonial government to place the town and its surrounding areas under the rule of a military government in the mid 18th century. Military governors during this period included Simon de Herrera Leiba and Pablo Enrique Yriarte Lanumbe. These military governments were charged with all civil and criminal proceedings in the region under their rule, known as Las Fronteras de Colotlán, which in addition to Colotlan, included the provinces of Nayarit and Bolaños. Upon the military government's dissolution in 1806, the area was divided into nine subdelegations and put under the rule of government of Nueva Galicia.

=== Modern ===
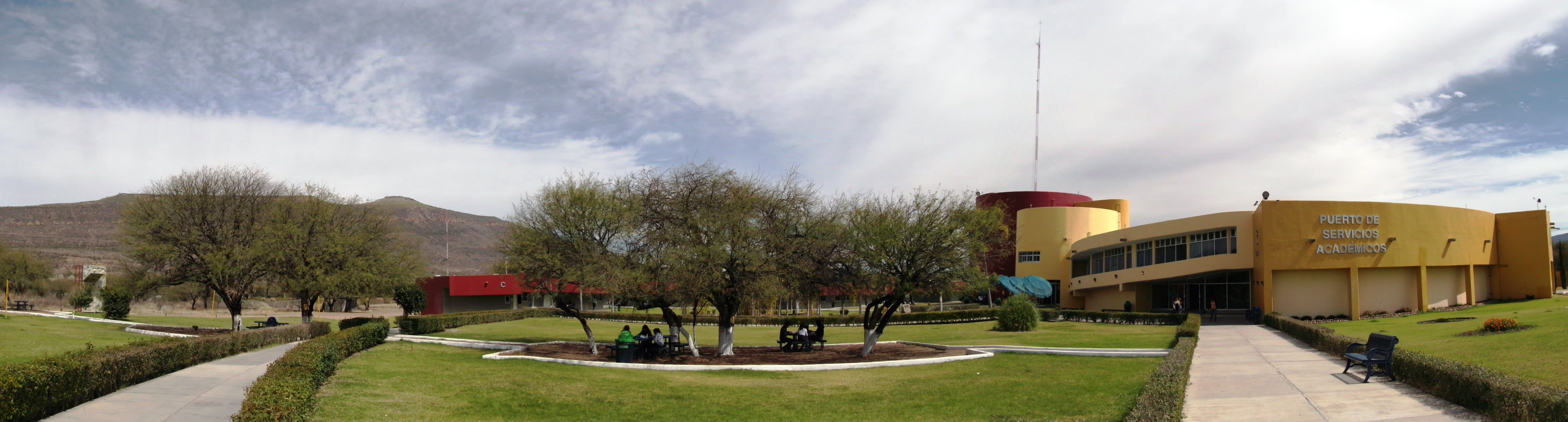
CUNorte, located in Colotlán

On November 12, 1810, a local indigenous leader from the Tlaxcala neighborhood, Marcos Escobedo along with a priest named Pablo José Calvillo, declared Colotlán independent from Spain and put himself and the local indigenous garrisons under the command of Miguel Hidalgo, leader of the independence movement.

In 1824, Colotlán was given the title of city and since that date served as seat of the 8th Canton of Jalisco. A municipal government was established by decree on April 8, 1844.

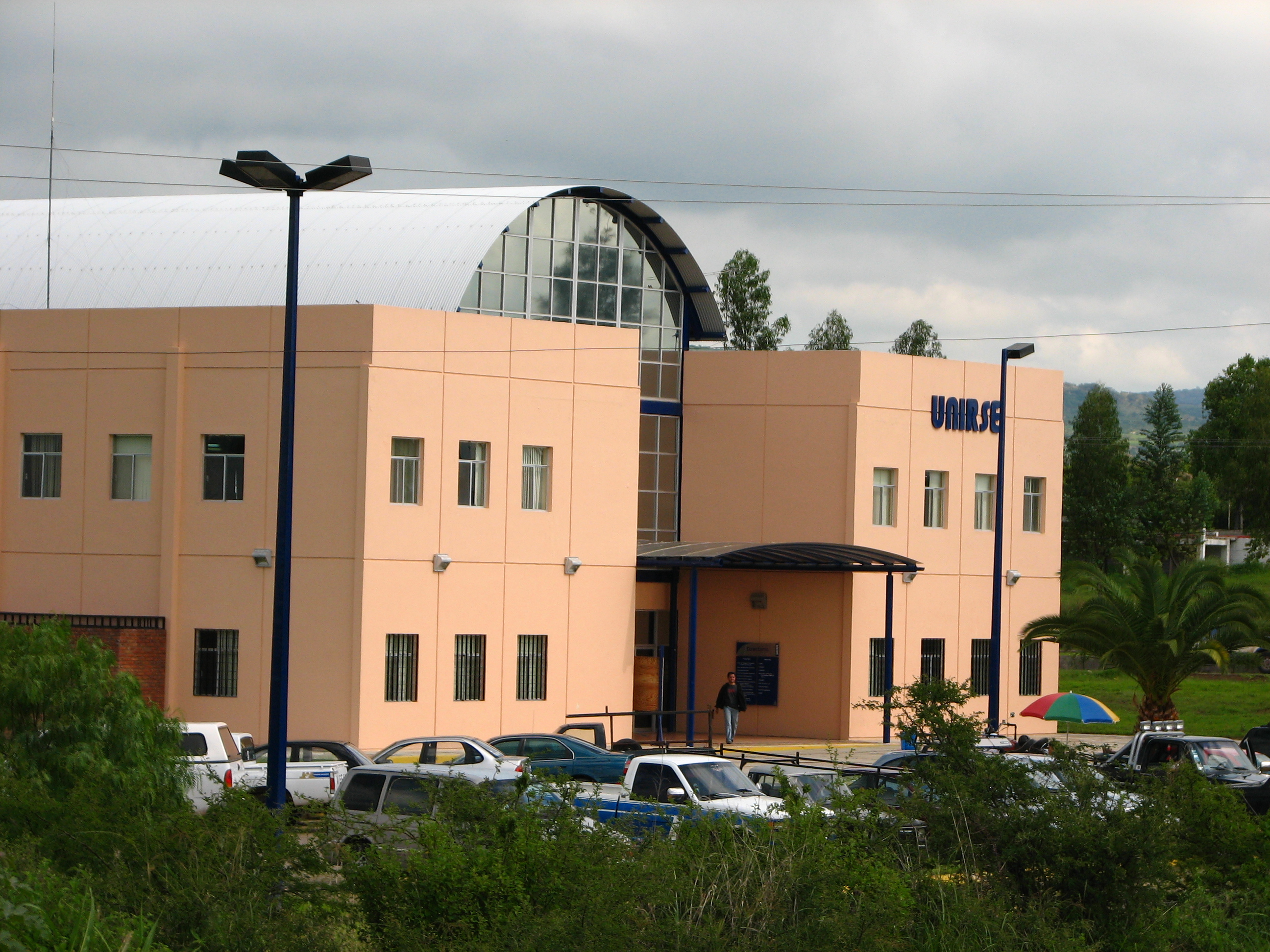
Center UNIRSE.

A small village in the municipality, called Agua Gorda, is the birthplace of Victoriano Huerta Márquez, President of Mexico from 1913 to 1914. He was born on December 23, 1850, son of Jesús Huerta and Refugio Márquez, who was purportedly of Huichol descent. Victoriano Huerta is one of the few Presidents of Mexico who were originally from the state of Jalisco (with Valentín Gómez Farías who served as acting president twice)

The area surrounding Colotlan was one of the principal battlegrounds of the Cristero Rebellion which lasted from 1927 to 1929, where pro-Catholic forces rebelled against the liberal and secularizing decrees instituted by Plutarco Elías Calles, which included suspension of worship, execution of non-compliant clergy, bans on clergy wearing clerical garb in public and on criticizing the government.

The parish priest of Totatiche, Cristóbal Magallanes Jara, who was canonized by Pope John Paul II in 1992, was executed by the Mexican government by firing squad in Colotlán on May 25, 1927 as a consequence of the Cristero conflict.

Colotlán is named "Capital del Cinto Piteado", Capital of the Piteado belt, this hand tailored belt among other things is made in Colotlán, and at one time provided a large portion of the income of the local residents. Demand has diminished for this product in recent years.

== Government ==
=== Municipal presidents ===
Municipal president	Term	Political party	Notes
Javier Ávila Mares	01-01-1983–31-12-1985	PRI	
Renato Haro Ortega	01-01-1986–31-12-1988	PRI	
Felipe Valdez Pacheco	1989–1992	PRI	
José de Jesús Alejo Mayorga	1992–1995	PAN	
Adolfo Pinedo Martínez	1995–1997	PAN	
José de Jesús Alejo Mayorga	01-01-1998–31-12-2000	PAN	
Osbaldo Leaños Medina	01-01-2001–31-12-2003	PRI	
José Luis Carrillo Sandoval	01-01-2004–31-12-2006	PAN	
Enrique Álvarez de la Torre	01-01-2007–2009	PAN	
José Julián Quezada Santoyo	2009	PAN	Acting municipal president
Enrique Álvarez de la Torre	2009	PAN	Resumed
José Luis Carrillo Sandoval	01-01-2010–30-09-2012	PAN	
José de Jesús Navarro Cárdenas	01-10-2012–30-09-2015	PRI; PVEM	Coalition "Compromise for Jalisco"
Armando Pinedo Martínez	01-10-2015–30-09-2018	PAN	
Jorge Alonso Arellano Gándara	01-10-2018–30-09-2021	PAN; PRD; MC	
José Julián Quezada Santoyo	01-10-2021-	MC	

== Geography ==
=== Climate ===
Climate data for Colotlán (1951–2010)
Month	Jan	Feb	Mar	Apr	May	Jun	Jul	Aug	Sep	Oct	Nov	Dec	Year
Record high °C (°F)	34.0 (93.2)	42.0 (107.6)	40.0 (104.0)	42.0 (107.6)	47.0 (116.6)	48.0 (118.4)	42.0 (107.6)	43.0 (109.4)	42.0 (107.6)	41.0 (105.8)	36.0 (96.8)	35.0 (95.0)	48.0 (118.4)
Mean daily maximum °C (°F)	24.0 (75.2)	25.9 (78.6)	28.0 (82.4)	30.8 (87.4)	33.0 (91.4)	32.3 (90.1)	29.3 (84.7)	29.0 (84.2)	28.7 (83.7)	27.7 (81.9)	26.5 (79.7)	24.1 (75.4)	28.3 (82.9)
Daily mean °C (°F)	14.5 (58.1)	15.7 (60.3)	17.7 (63.9)	20.1 (68.2)	22.6 (72.7)	23.5 (74.3)	21.8 (71.2)	21.5 (70.7)	21.1 (70.0)	19.3 (66.7)	17.0 (62.6)	15.0 (59.0)	19.2 (66.6)
Mean daily minimum °C (°F)	5.1 (41.2)	5.6 (42.1)	7.5 (45.5)	9.5 (49.1)	12.3 (54.1)	14.6 (58.3)	14.3 (57.7)	14.0 (57.2)	13.6 (56.5)	10.9 (51.6)	7.4 (45.3)	5.9 (42.6)	10.1 (50.2)
Record low °C (°F)	−4.0 (24.8)	−4.5 (23.9)	−3.2 (26.2)	0.0 (32.0)	2.0 (35.6)	1.0 (33.8)	1.0 (33.8)	2.0 (35.6)	2.0 (35.6)	2.0 (35.6)	−5.5 (22.1)	−2.5 (27.5)	−5.5 (22.1)
Average precipitation mm (inches)	17.3 (0.68)	8.2 (0.32)	6.0 (0.24)	7.7 (0.30)	12.0 (0.47)	84.4 (3.32)	162.6 (6.40)	144.3 (5.68)	93.4 (3.68)	40.9 (1.61)	11.5 (0.45)	13.1 (0.52)	601.4 (23.68)
Average precipitation days (≥ 0.1 mm)	1.8	0.9	0.7	0.8	2.2	9.4	15.7	15.4	11.2	5.3	1.6	2.4	67.4
Average relative humidity (%)	54	50	42	41	43	58	64	66	65	61	57	57	55
Mean monthly sunshine hours	261	263	288	310	308	257	233	246	233	255	262	240	3,156
Source 1: Servicio Meteorológico Nacional (humidity 1981–2000)
Source 2: Deutscher Wetterdienst (sun, 1961–1990) (Note: Station ID for Colotlan is 76519 Use this station ID to locate the sunshine duration)

== Natural attractions ==
One of the natural attractions of Colotlán is a natural canyon known as "La Barranca" located about 1 kilometer east of El Refugio, in the south east part of the municipality. This canyon runs for approximately 5 kilometers and is the exit of the basin of approximately 100 square kilometers that was formed in the highlands in the neighbouring state of Zacatecas between the Sierra de Morones and the "Cerro Chichimeco" (Chichimeco mountain, approximately 2,600 meters above sea level). The canyon is also the origin of the "Chichoca" River, that runs east–west and that joins the Colotlán River before joining the Bolaños River, one of the most important tributaries, running north–south, of the Lerma-Santiago River.

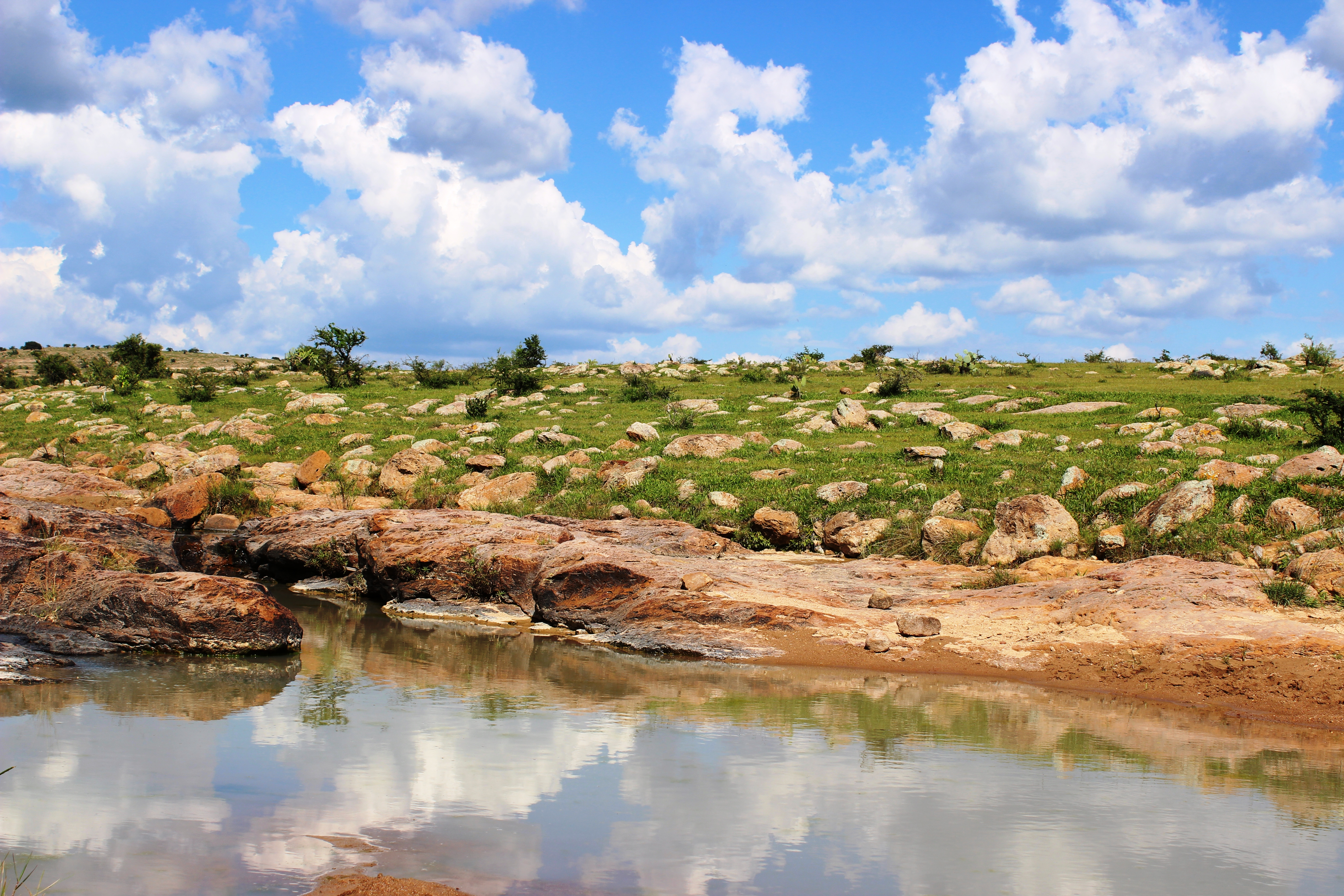

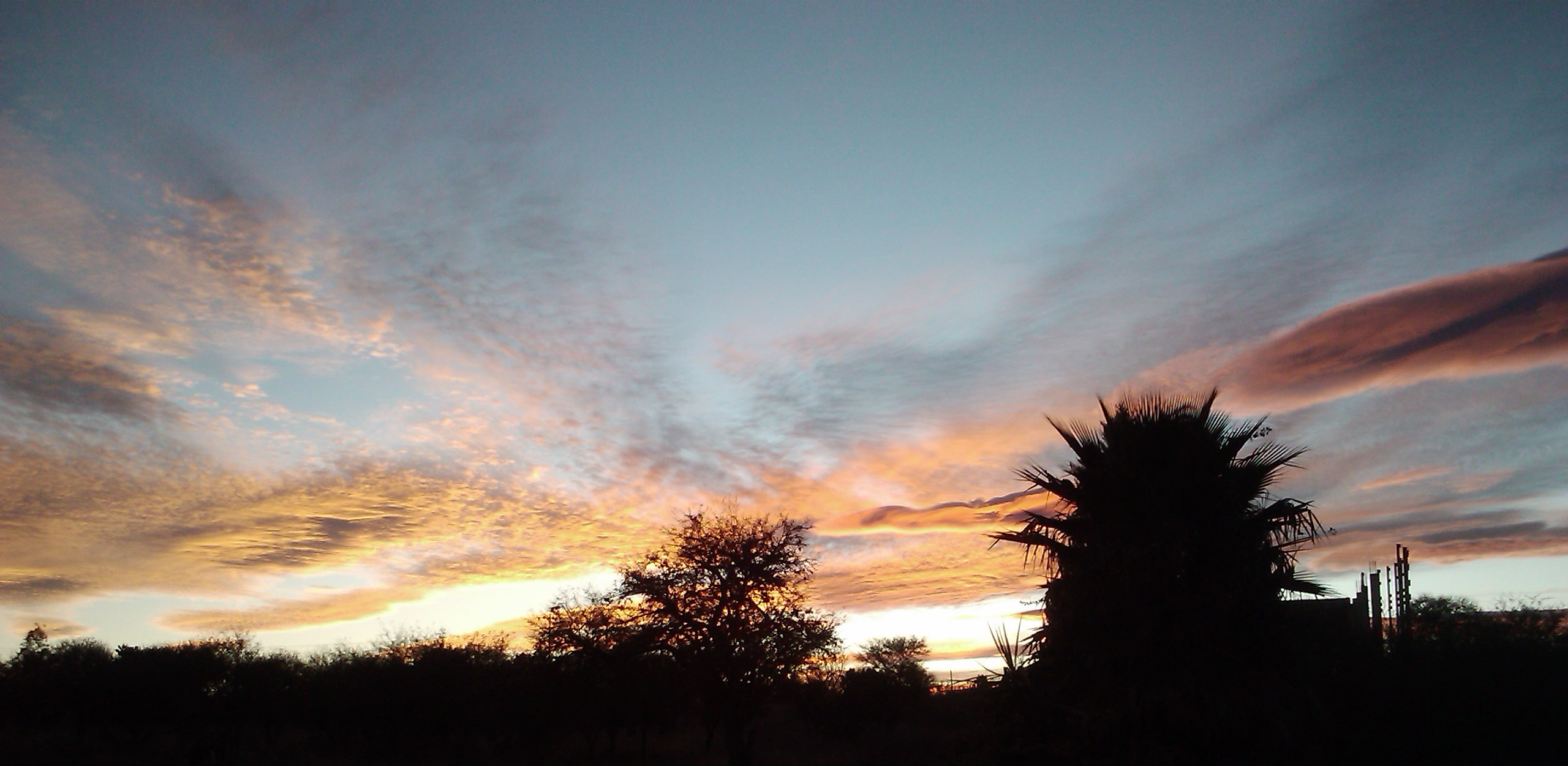

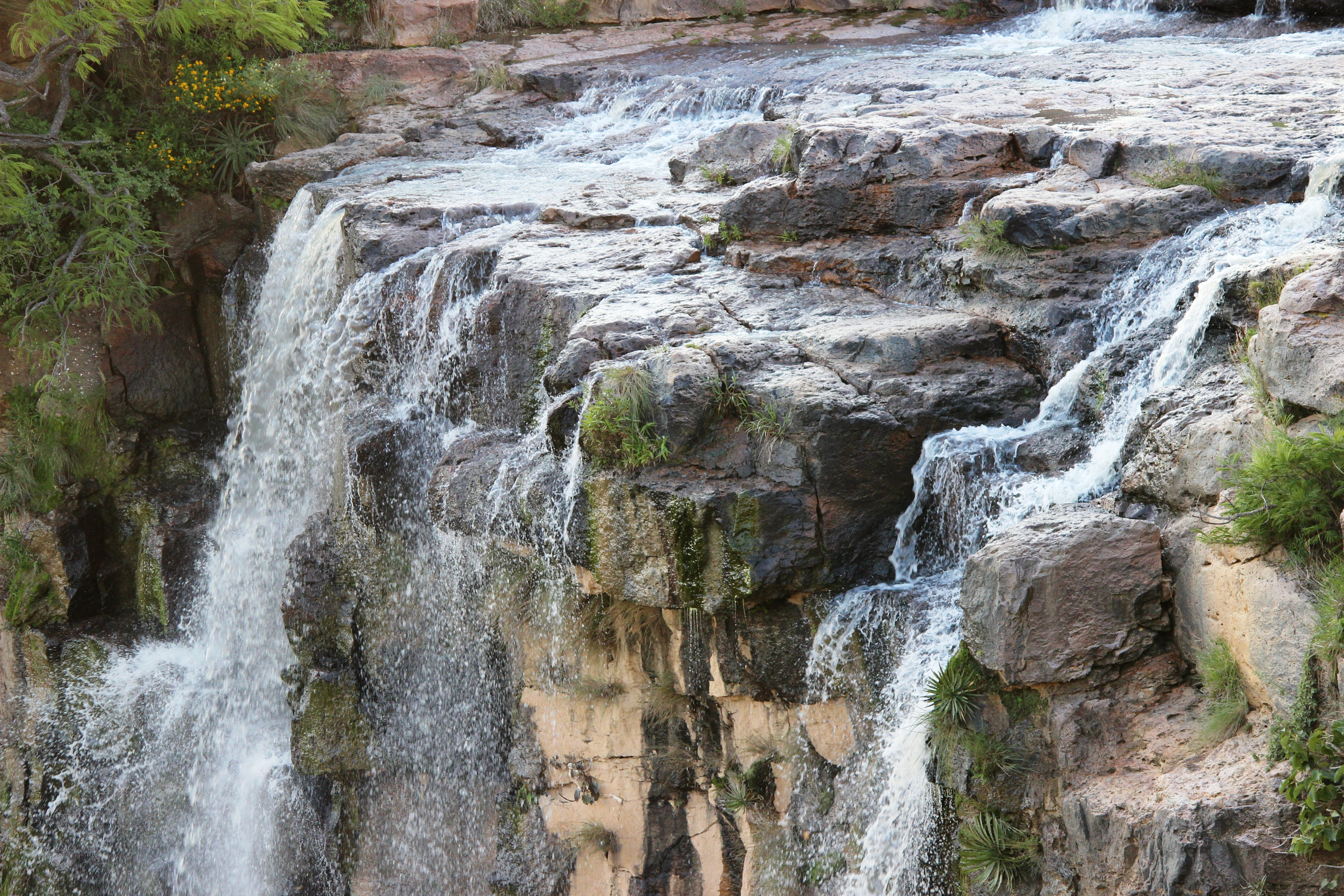

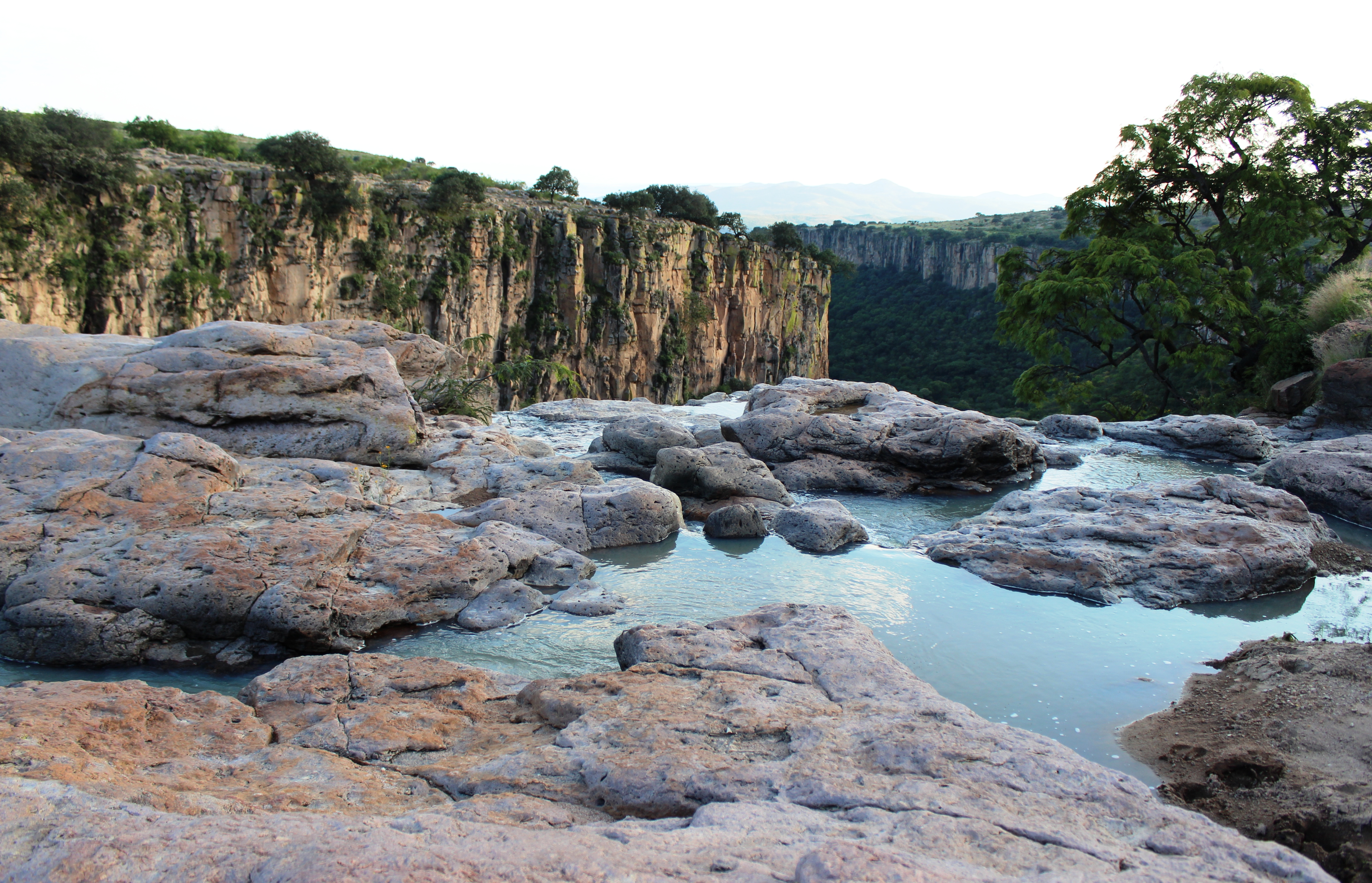

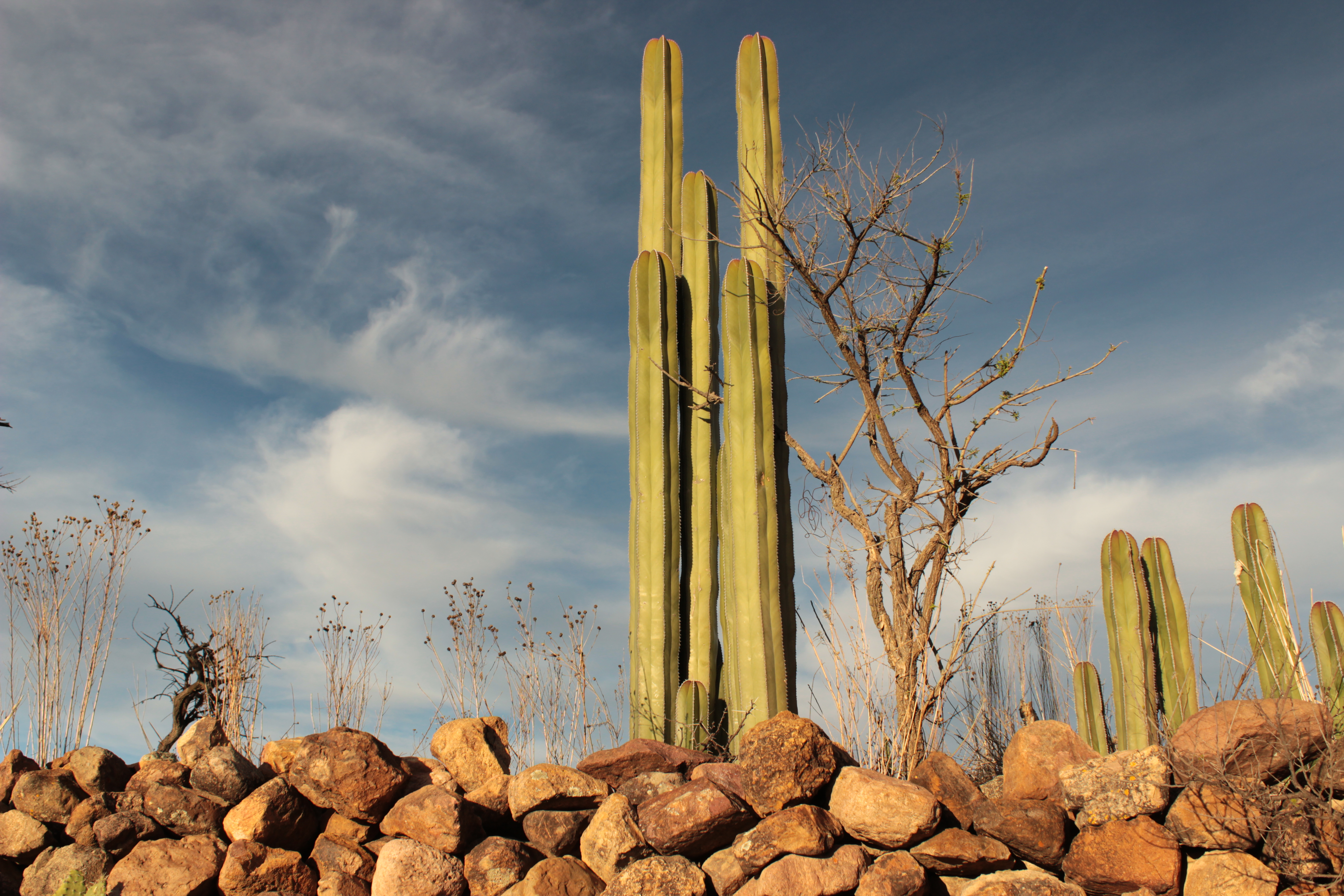

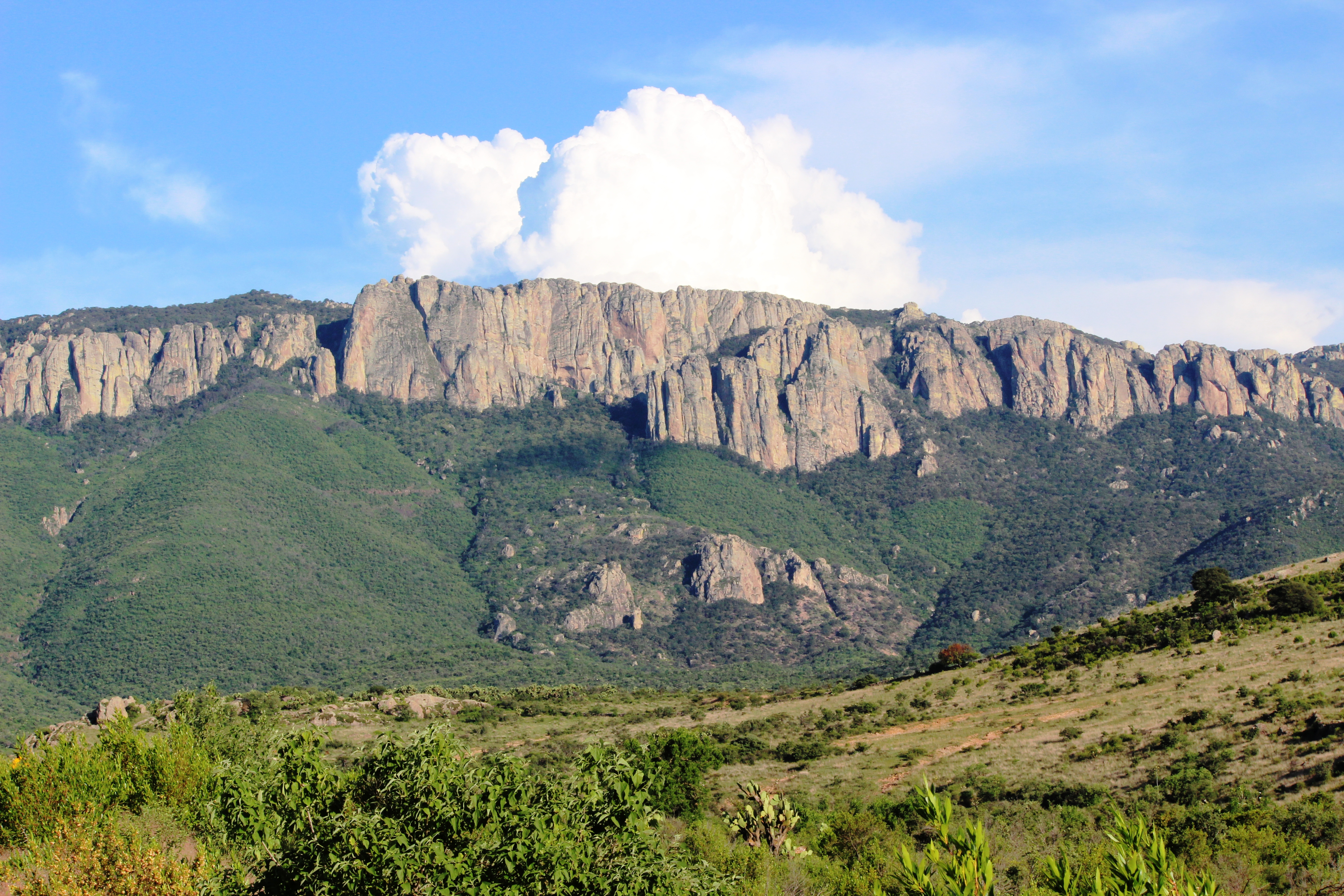

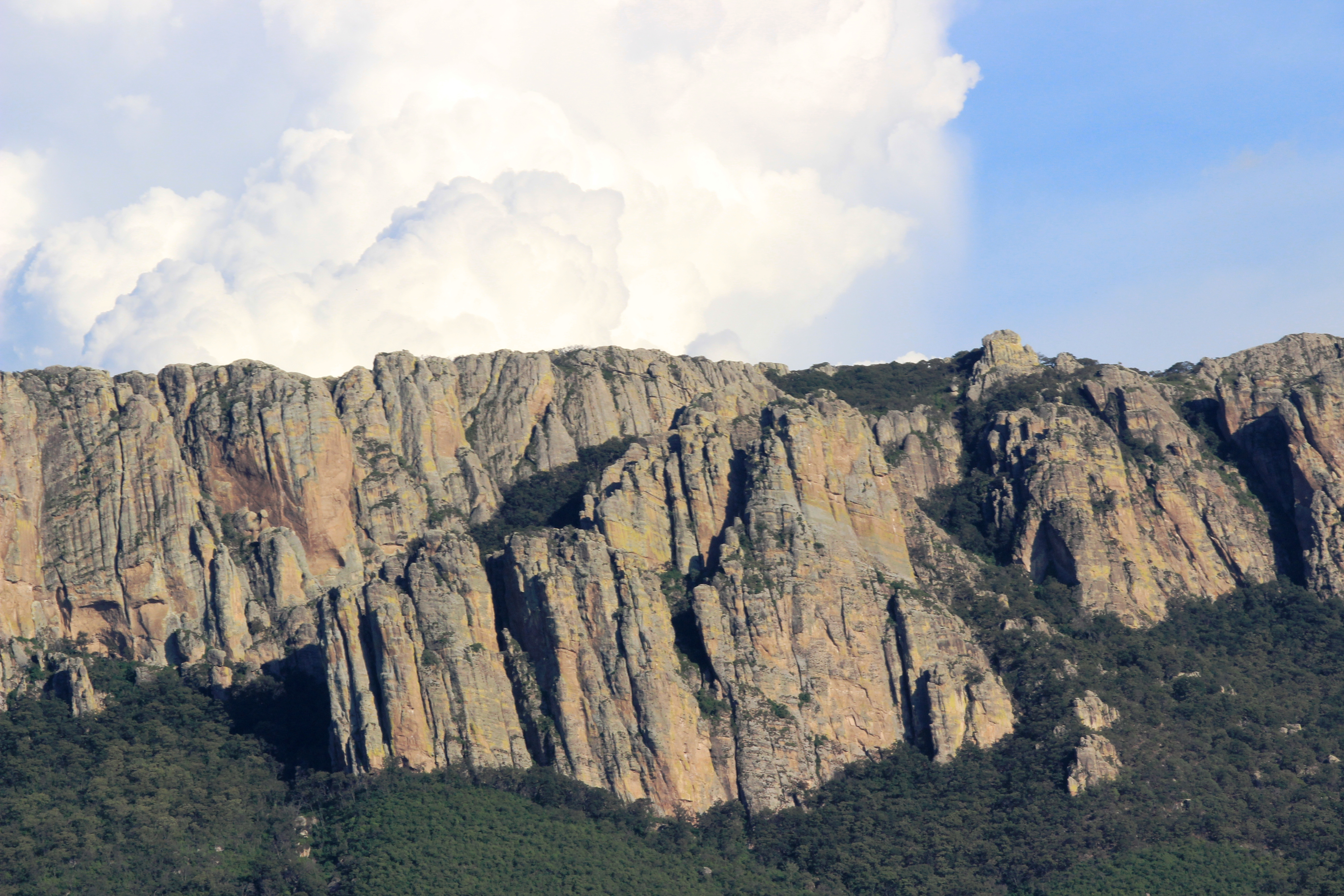

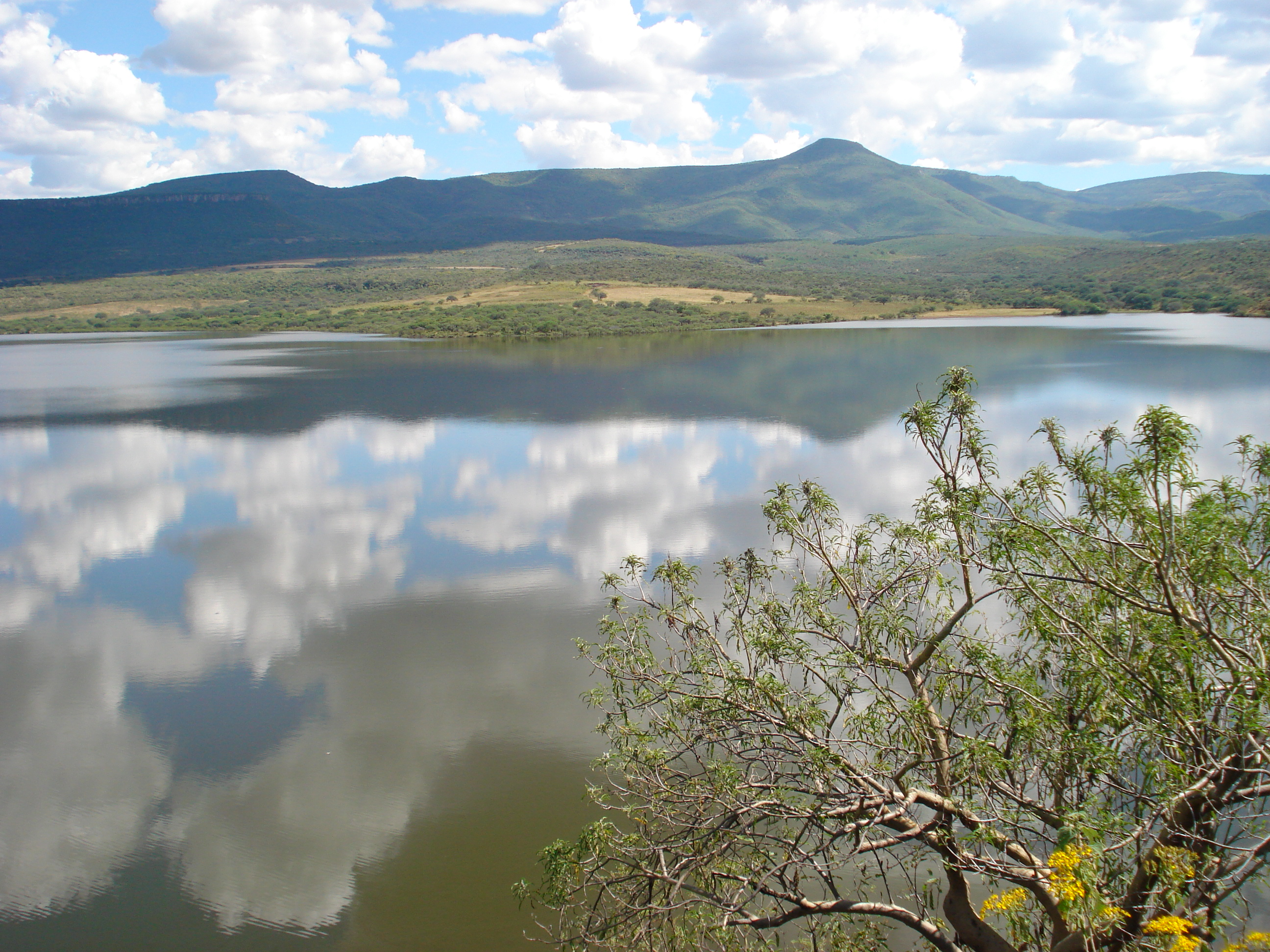

== Symbols ==
=== Coat of arms ===
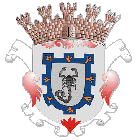
Seal of City of Colotlán.

Colotlán has a Spanish-style coat of arms with a Castilian crown at the top and a scorpion in the center of the heraldic field; it means “Alongside the scorpions” in the Nahuatl language.

=== Flag ===
Colotlán
- Use: Civil and state flag
- Proportion: 4:7

The flag of Colotlán consists of a red rectangle with a ratio of four to seven; in the center it bears the Municipal Coat of arms in gold, placed in such a way that it occupies three-quarters of the width.

== Sources ==
- Instituto Nacional de Estadistica, Geografia e Informatica (INEGI)
- Botello Aceves, Brígida del Carmen, en Memoria del Municipio en Jalisco. Unidad Editorial, Gobierno de Jalisco, 1987
