= Villa Guerrero, Jalisco =

Villa Guerrero
- Municipality
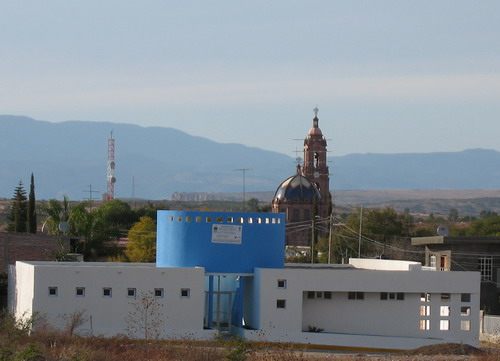

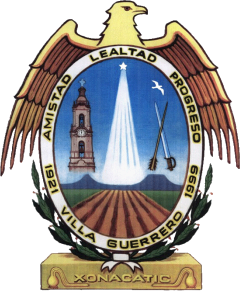
- Coat of arms

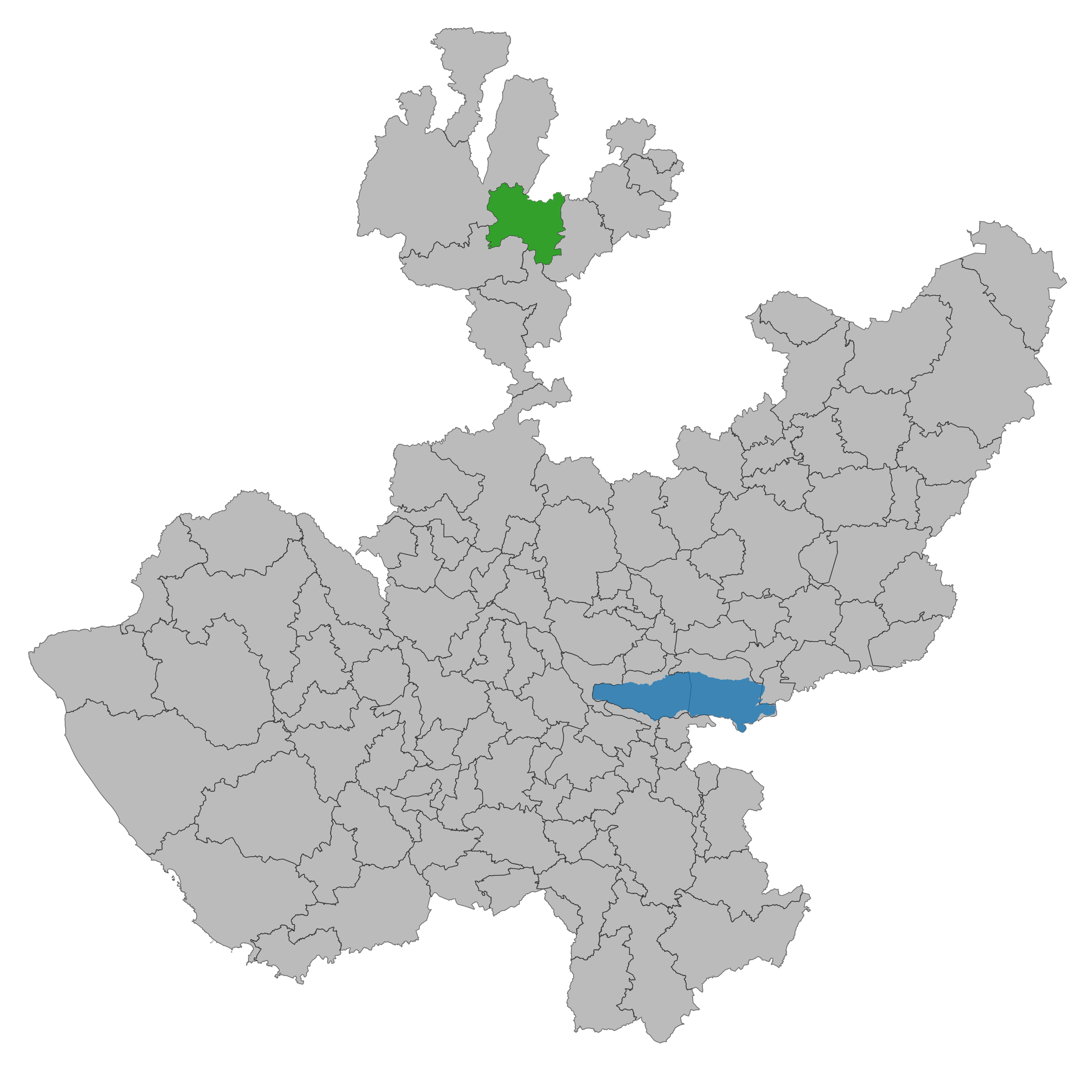

- Location within Jalisco Location within Mexico
- Coordinates: 21°52′52.8″N 103°35′45.75″W
- Country: Mexico
- State: Jalisco

Government
  - Mayor: José Sarrelangue

Area
  - Total: 673.3 km^{2} (260.0 sq mi)
  - Seat: 2.42 km^{2} (0.93 sq mi)
- Elevation: 1,767 m (5,797 ft)

Population (2020 census)
  - Total: 5,525
  - Density: 8.206/km^{2} (21.25/sq mi)
  - Seat: 4,023
  - Seat density: 1,660/km^{2} (4,310/sq mi)
- Demonym: Villa Guerrense
- Time zone: UTC-6 (Central (US Central))
- Postal code: 46-100
- Area code: (52) 437

Villa Guerrero is a municipality in the north of the state of Jalisco, Mexico. It is located between 103°22′30″ and 103°50′00″ longitude west and 21°54′00″ and 22°10′00″ latitude north, at an altitude of 1,767 metres (5,797 ft) above sea level. The municipality covers an area of 673.3 square kilometres (260.0 sq mi).

== Population ==
The municipality's population in 2020 was 5,525 inhabitants, of which 4,023 lived in the municipal seat of Villa Guerrero. The remaining population was spread throughout the rural areas within the municipality's borders. Some other notable localities within these borders include Azqueltán, Ojo de Agua de Cardos, Santa Rita, La Guásima, Las Adjuntas, Izolta, La Nopalera, La Cienega de Marquez, Uribes, and Patagua.

The municipality has suffered decreasing population in recent decades, largely due to emigration. In 2000, 31% of the working population was employed in agriculture and husbandry, 14% in construction, 13% in commerce and 13% in manufacturing.

== History ==
Prior to the Spanish conquest, the municipality of Villa Guerrero was inhabited by the indigenous Tepecan (Tepehuan). The area was conquered by the Spanish Captain Pedro Almíndez Chirino, sent by Nuño Beltrán de Guzmán in the year 1530. Shortly after the arrival of the Spanish into the area, the Huichol (Wixarika) migrated to the area's remote canyons and mountains. The Spanish settlement of the area at the end of the 16th century brought a number of Tlaxcaltec colonizers to the area.

In its origins it was named "Xonacatic", which means "place of onions", but not of the edible onion, but of those commonly known as "chives", which are born alone in times of water and in muddy places.

The oldest Spanish land grant in the area was in 1579 to Luis de los Rios Proaño. The grant was for approximately 120 km^{2} in the valley of Juanacatic (from the indigenous name for the valley: Xoncacatic, meaning place of the onions). Missions were founded by the Franciscans in the area in the latter years of the 16th century. In the early 17th century, the area was the scene of a number of indigenous uprisings, including one by the Wixarika and Tepecan in 1607, resulting in its abandonment by the few Spanish settlers. In 1622, the descendants of the original grantee took interest once again in the land, seeking out titles in Zacatecas. The land was eventually sold to Captain Juan de Escobedo and Captain Juan Diaz de Infante. Around 1673, European settlement in the region was still limited, with only one agricultural hacienda in the region known as Juanacatic. By 1673, the place was an agricultural and cattle ranch called Juanacatic, owned by the Spanish captain Juan de Escobedo.

In 1676, the Spanish military administrator for the region of Colotlán Toribio González de Escalante, began the extraction of saltpeter in the valley. From this activity, the place gained the name of El Salitre. Eventually the extraction of saltpeter ceased due to its cost inefficiency and the administrator's inability to retain sufficient labor.

In 1702, the Tepehuan and Wixarika from the nearby mountains and canyons joined forces in a rebellion. The result was an adjudication by the Spanish Crown that forced the major Spanish landowner, Ana de Santiago, widow of Juan Diaz de Infante, to trade some of her agricultural land in the plateau for land in the canyon. Thus the Tepehuan regained part of their historic lands in a location known as Patahua. The Tepehuan community received an official grant for the land in 1733.

In 1779, the Juanacatic hacienda was acquired by Pedro de Llanos y Valdés as the area began to experience large flows of European immigration. Agricultural activity and husbandry benefited from the mining activities in nearby Bolaños, which had begun large scale production in the 1730s. El Salitre became a regular stopover of the mule trains that transported the ore out of the canyon.

There were several battles in 1810 during the war for independence fought in the region. Many of the local indigenous groups, including the Wixarika fought on the side of the Spanish Crown.

Political reforms, such as the Iguala Plan undertaken in 1821 by the newly independent government extinguished separate treatment of indigenous communities and communal lands of the Tepehuan were distributed to individuals. In 1838, the area was made part of the 8th Canton of the free and sovereign state of Jalisco, within the Mexican Republic and was assigned to the municipality of Totatiche within that canton.

Construction on a stone church to replace the adobe chapel of the town of El Salitre began in 1905. The work was completed nearly two decades later, following the Mexican Revolution. Soon thereafter, in 1921, the municipality was separated from the municipality of Totatiche and declared an independent municipality by the state legislature and renamed Villa Guerrero in honor of Vicente Guerrero.

== Geography ==
The municipality shares its border on the north with the state of Zacatecas and the Mezquitic Municipality, to the south with Bolaños Municipality and Chimaltitán Municipality. To the east, it shares its border with Totatiche Municipality and to the west with Mezquitic Municipality.

=== Orography ===
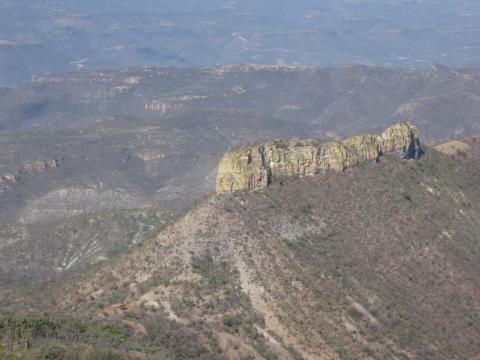
Orography of Villa Guerrero: The Bolaños Canyon

The most common type of terrain in the municipality is mountainous (46%) followed by plains (34%) and rolling hills (20%). The altitudes in the municipality vary greatly, ranging from 900 to 2,100 meters (2,950–6,900) above sea level. Their highest elevations are: in the north, Mount of the Cross (Cerro de la Cruz), to the west, White Deer Mountain (Cerro del Venado Blanco), the Toril Mesa and the Chihuahua Mesa; to the south and southeast, Pine Mountain (Cerro del Pino) and Thistles Mountain (Cerro de los Cardos).

=== Hydrography ===
The municipality's hydrologic resources are provided mainly by the Bolaños River. Other larger streams with permanent flow include: Sataray River, Blue Puddle (Charco Azul) River and La Villa River. There are also streams with seasonal flow, including: Chihuahua Creek, Nogales Creek, Zacatequillas Creek, New Water (Agua Nueva) Creek, Rinconada Creek, La Labor Creek, Las Planillas Creek and Juanacatic Creek

=== Climate ===
The municipality's climate is semiarid, with dry winters and springs, and a temperate and dry winter without a well defined spring season. The annual average temperature is of 18.7 °C (66 °F), with a high of 27.6 °C (82 °F) and low of 9.8 °C (50 °F). Rainy season occurs in the months of June, July and August, and includes an average rainfall of 803.2 millimetres (31.62 in). There are an annual average of 11 days of frost. The dominant winds are in direction of the southeast.

=== Flora and fauna ===
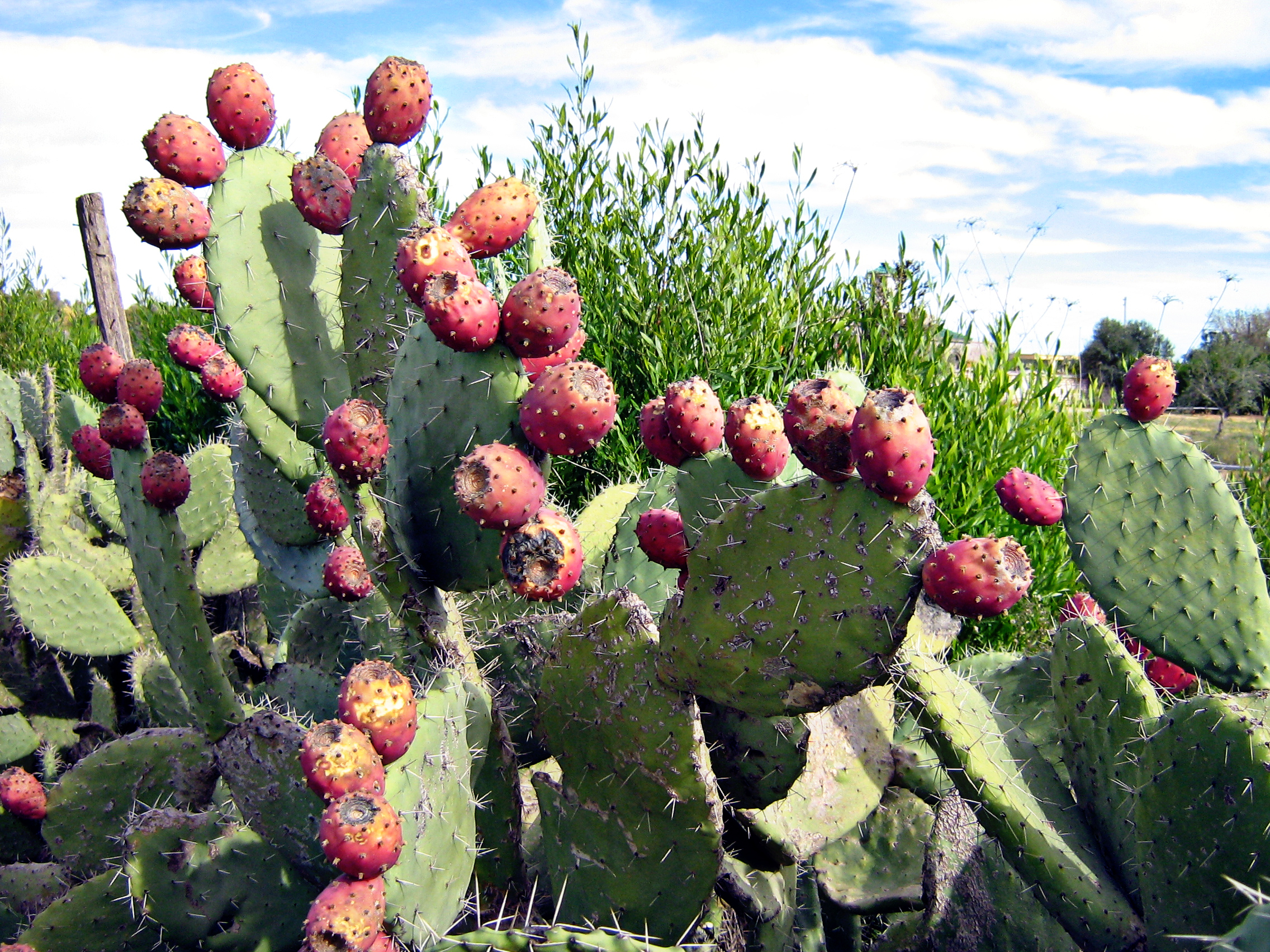
Villa Guerrero Vegetation: Prickly pear cactus

In the highest altitude zones there are natural forests composed of pine. In the lower altitudes, oak and live oak trees dominate. In the hills and lower altitudes there are cacti, acacia, Arizona kidneywood and other plant species. The foothills and the plains are covered by natural grasses. Wild cactus such as Stenocereus queretaroensis and Opuntia also grow freely in the area.

Rabbits, hares, deer, coyotes, reptiles, mountain lions and other smaller species inhabit in this region.

=== Land use ===
The composition of the municipality's soil includes Haplic Feozem, Regosol and Chromic Luvisol. The municipality has a territorial surface of 1,092.03 km^{2} (269,850 acres), of which 282.98 km^{2} (69,930 acres) are utilized for agriculture, 2,330.26 km^{2} (575,820 acres) in livestock activities, 500 km^{2} (120,000 acres) for forestry. Urban areas cover 0.3 km^{2} (74 acres) and 75.73 km^{2} have other uses. 1,047.03 km^{2} (258,730 acres) are owned by private parties and 45 km^{2} (11,000 acres) are communal property.

== Sources ==
- Enciclopedia de los Municipios de México, State of Jalisco
- Robert Dennis Shadow, Tierra Trabajo y Ganado en la Region Norte de Jalisco
- Nicolas Valdés Huerta, Historia de Villa Guerrero
- Insituto Nacional de Estadística, Geografía e Informática
- Sistema de información del Estado de Jalisco
