= Tenzompa, Jalisco =

Town in Jalisco, Mexico

Tenzompa
- Town
- Location in Mexico, Guadalajara, Jalisco Tenzompa (Mexico)
- Coordinates: 22.3725034°N 103.9270575°W
- Country: Mexico
- State: Jalisco
- Municipality: Huejuquilla el Alto
- Elevation: 1,770 m (5,810 ft)

Population (2020)
  - Total: 741
- Time zone: UTC−6 (Central Standard Time)
  - Summer (DST): UTC−5 (Central Daylight Time)

Tenzompa (Meaning of the huichol from: "Mujer Bonita"; i.e. English: Beautiful Woman), is a community south of the Huejuquilla El Alto Municipality, Jalisco, it has a population of 734 inhabitants as of the 2020 Mexico Census, it is located 33 km (21 mi) from Huejuquilla el Alto and 400 km (250 mi) from Guadalajara.

It has a Huichol indigenous population of 6.54%, the name of this community is due to the Tenzompa River that surrounds the community while to the north it is surrounded by the homonymous mountain range, part of the Sierra Madre Occidental, its founding year is currently unknown although it is known that it was founded before the Spanish arrival and for having been founded on a hill three km (1.9 mi) from its current location due to some ruins found.

== Climate ==
Climate data for Tenzompa (1991–2020 normals, extremes 1978–2021)
Month	Jan	Feb	Mar	Apr	May	Jun	Jul	Aug	Sep	Oct	Nov	Dec	Year
Record high °C (°F)	35 (95)	35 (95)	39.5 (103.1)	39 (102)	40 (104)	39 (102)	37 (99)	33.5 (92.3)	39.5 (103.1)	34.5 (94.1)	32 (90)	30 (86)	40 (104)
Mean daily maximum °C (°F)	22.5 (72.5)	24.5 (76.1)	26.8 (80.2)	29.4 (84.9)	31.7 (89.1)	30.6 (87.1)	27.4 (81.3)	27.1 (80.8)	26.6 (79.9)	26.0 (78.8)	24.0 (75.2)	21.9 (71.4)	26.5 (79.7)
Daily mean °C (°F)	11.6 (52.9)	13.0 (55.4)	15.0 (59.0)	17.4 (63.3)	20.8 (69.4)	22.3 (72.1)	20.5 (68.9)	20.2 (68.4)	19.5 (67.1)	17.4 (63.3)	13.9 (57.0)	11.6 (52.9)	16.9 (62.4)
Mean daily minimum °C (°F)	0.7 (33.3)	1.5 (34.7)	3.2 (37.8)	5.4 (41.7)	9.9 (49.8)	13.9 (57.0)	13.6 (56.5)	13.3 (55.9)	12.5 (54.5)	8.8 (47.8)	3.8 (38.8)	1.4 (34.5)	7.3 (45.1)
Record low °C (°F)	−8.5 (16.7)	−8 (18)	−6 (21)	−5.5 (22.1)	−1 (30)	3.5 (38.3)	1.5 (34.7)	5 (41)	1 (34)	−2 (28)	−10 (14)	−10.5 (13.1)	−10.5 (13.1)
Average precipitation mm (inches)	20.2 (0.80)	17.7 (0.70)	6.2 (0.24)	2.2 (0.09)	11.5 (0.45)	111.4 (4.39)	185.1 (7.29)	163.5 (6.44)	115.0 (4.53)	34.6 (1.36)	12.2 (0.48)	14.3 (0.56)	693.9 (27.32)
Average precipitation days	2.3	1.9	0.9	0.9	2.9	13.3	17.8	16.4	13.3	5.5	2.1	1.6	78.9
Source: Servicio Meteorológico Nacional
