= Tuxpan (disambiguation) =

Tuxpan is a municipality and city in Veracruz, Mexico.

Tuxpan may also refer to other places in Mexico:

- Tuxpan, Jalisco
- Tuxpan, Michoacán
- Tuxpan, Nayarit

== Municipalities ==
- Tuxpan Municipality, Jalisco
- Tuxpan Municipality, Michoacán
- Tuxpan Municipality, Nayarit
- Tuxpan Municipality, Veracruz

== Rivers ==
- Tuxpan River (Jalisco)
- Tuxpan River (Veracruz), emptying into the Gulf of Mexico
- Tuxpan River, another river in Veracruz, tributary of the Papaloapan River near Tlacotalpan

== Others ==
- Roman Catholic Diocese of Tuxpan

== See also ==
- Tuxpan de Bolaños
