= Bolaño =

Bolaño is a Hispanic surname (Spanish for "stone cannonball" or "stoneshot"). It may refer to:

- Chico Bolaño (1902–1962), Colombian accordionist
- Jorge Bolaño (1977–2025), Colombian footballer
- Óscar Bolaño (1951–2017), Colombian footballer
- Roberto Bolaño (1953–2003), Chilean writer

== See also ==
- Bolano, a municipality in Italy
- Bolaños (disambiguation)
- Bollano (disambiguation)
