= Bollani =

Bollani (Italian pronunciation: [bolˈlaːni]) is an Italian surname. Notable people with the surname include:

- Domenico Bollani (1514–1579), Venetian politician
- Stefano Bollani (born 1972), Italian musician

== See also ==
- Bollano
