= Bollano =

Bollano is a surname. Notable people with the surname include:

- Angelo Bollano (1918–1978), Italian footballer
- Vasil Bollano (born 1958), Albanian politician of Greek origin, chairman of Omonoia and representative of the Northern Epirotes

== See also ==
- Bollani
- Bolano
- Bolaño (disambiguation)
