= Totatiche =

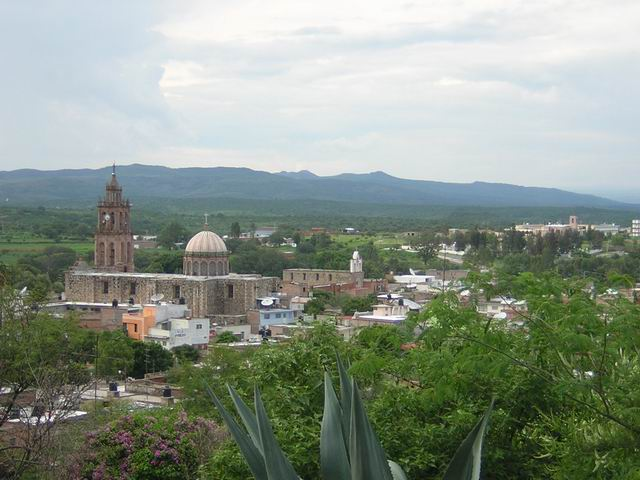

- Coat of arms

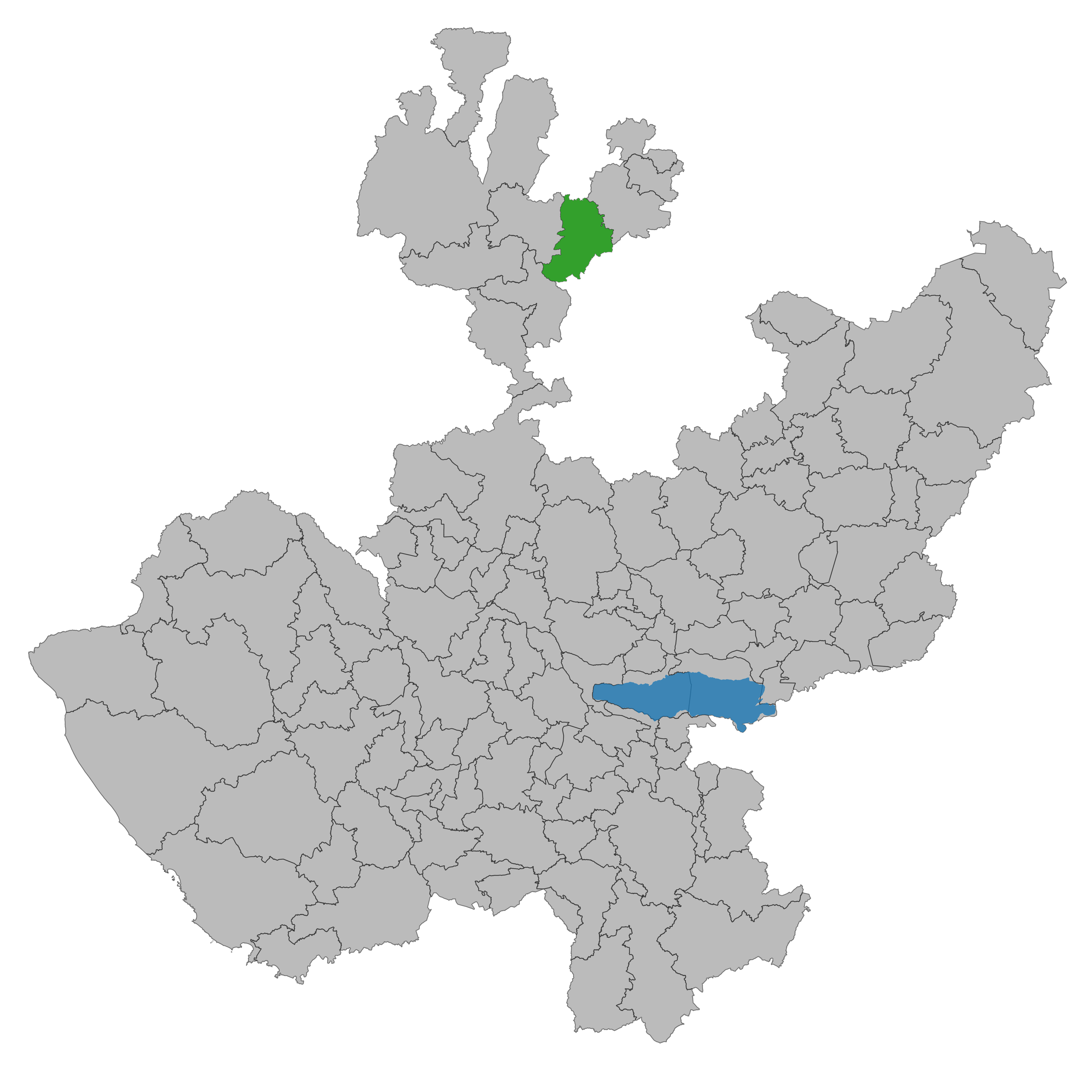

- Location within Jalisco Location within Mexico
- Coordinates: 21°56′N 103°27′W
- Country: Mexico
- State: Jalisco
- Municipality: Totatiche
- Founded: 1595

Government
  - Mayor: Salvador Luna Jara

Area
  - Municipality: 542.98 km^{2} (209.65 sq mi)
- Elevation: 1,751 m (5,745 ft)

Population (2005)
  - Total: 4,217
  - Demonym: Totatichense
- Time zone: UTC-6 (Central (US Central))
- Postal code: 46-170
- Area code: (52) 437
- Website: www.totatichejalisco.com

The municipality and town of Totatiche is located in the northern extreme of the state of Jalisco, Mexico between 21° 48' 30" and 22° 06' 00" latitude north and 103° 20' 00" and 103° 34' 00" longitude east at a height of 1,751 meters (5,745 ft) above sea level. The municipality is bordered on the north and southeast by the state of Zacatecas. On the northeast, it shares its border with the municipality of Colotlán and on the west it is bordered by the municipalities of Villa Guerrero and Chimaltitán.

The municipality covers an area of 542.98 square kilometers (209.65 sq mi). Its hydrology is defined by the Bolaños river, which demarcates its northern border with Zacatecas and the Cartagenas River which crosses the municipality and flows into the latter. There are five dams in the municipality: Candelaria, Magallanes, Temastián, La Boquilla and Agua Zarca and smaller ones in Romita, San Francisco, and Totolco.

== Population ==
The population of the municipality of Totatiche was 4,217 inhabitants in 2005, of which 1,287 lived in the municipal seat Totatiche. In 2000, there were 1,372 economically active individuals. Of these, the largest percentage (37.2%) were employed in ranching and agriculture, followed by the manufacturing sector (12.9%), commerce (10.9%) and construction (10.7%).

== History ==
Totatiche is located in what was historically the convergence of territories of various indigenous tribes, namely tribes of the Tepehuan, Caxcan and Zacatec. This area, north of the Lerma-Santiago river, was known by the Mexica and later by the Spaniards as the Chichimeca, and the ethnic groups of the area, collectively referred to as Chichimecs, were considered bellicose and uncivilized.

In April 1530, Captain Pedro Almíndez Chirino is sent from El Teul towards Zacatecas by Nuño Beltrán de Guzmán. On his return from Zacatecas, Alméndez Chirinos was to meet Beltrán de Guzmán in Tepic. The route from Zacatecas to Tepic led Alméndez Chirinos through the area of what is now Totatiche and west toward the Bolaños Canyon. Upon his arrival in Tepic, he informed Nuño Beltrán de Guzmán of the area's wealth of silver.

Totatiche was founded in April 1595 by Captain Miguel Caldera, Justice Major and protector of the pacified Chichimec tribes. The Viceroy of New Spain had sent several hundred Tlaxcaltec families to settle nearby Colotlán in 1591, in order to populate the region and help pacify the still unruly Chichimecs of the region. It is believed that some of these families were later moved to Totatiche with similar goals.

After founding the convent in nearby Colotlán in August 1591, Fray Juan Gómez proceeded with the conversion of local indigenous tribes to Christianity. At that time, there were a mere seven haciendas in the region: Acatepulco, founded in 1571, Santa María de Gracia, Totolco, El Salitre, Juanacatic, Patagua and Cartagena. At the end of the 17th century the small Spanish population in the area was centered on Cartagena and a hacienda owned by the De La O family. A number of land grants in the region were made to Spaniards at the end of the 17th and beginning of the 18th century. Among the grantees were Felipe Lemus, Juan Jose Pinedo and Francisco Gutierres del Palacio. In April 1711, Fray Antonio Margil de Jesús embarked on a mission in Totatiche whose historical legacy is the local vocation to the Virgen del Rosario, the town and the parish's patron saint.

Population began to grow considerably after 1730 due to the local wealth created by the silver mines in nearby Bolaños. Totatiche depended on Colotlán for administrative and religious purposes until 1755 when a local parish was established. Construction on the currently standing parish temple in the town center was finished in 1901.

Totatiche hosts an auxiliary seminary of the Archdiocese of Guadalajara. The seminary was founded in 1915 by Saint Cristóbal Magallanes Jara, who was arrested in the town in 1926 and later executed in neighboring Colotlán as part of the persecution of clergy during the Cristero Rebellion.

== Sources ==
- Esteban Valdés Salazar, Historia de Totatiche
- Instituto Nacional de Estadística, Geografía e Informática (INEGI)
- State of Jalisco, Enciclopedia de los Municipios de México
