= San Andrés Cohamiata =

San Andrés Cohamiata Tatei Kié
- Autonomously governed Wixárika village
- Location in Mexico
- Coordinates: 22°12′N 104°03′W
- Country: Mexico
- State: Jalisco
- Municipality: Mezquitic

San Andrés Cohamiata is an autonomously governed Wixárika (Huichol) village located in Mezquitic, Jalisco, Mexico. The village is called Tatei Kié in the native Wixárika language.

Other Wixárika ceremonial centers that share similar autonomous governments include: Santa Catarina Cuexcomatitián (Tuapurie), San Sebastián Teponahuaxtlán (Wautia) and Tuxpan de Bolaños (Tutsipa) which are all in the state of Jalisco, and Guadalupe Ocotán (Xatsitsarie) in the state of Nayarit.
