= Bolaños (surname) =

Bolaños is a Hispanic surname. (Spanish for the plural "stone cannonballs" or "stoneshots") Notable people with the surname include:

- Alex Bolaños (born 1985), Ecuadorian footballer
- Christian Bolaños (born 1984), Costa Rican footballer
- Elías Samuel Bolaños Avelar (born 1951), Salvadoran Roman Catholic bishop
- Enar Bolaños (born 1983), Costa Rican footballer
- Enrique Bolaños (1928–2021), Nicaraguan politician, president 2002–2007
- Félix Bolaños (born 1975), Spanish lawyer and politician
- Hernán Bolaños (1912–1992), Costa Rican-Nicaraguan footballer
- Horacio Gómez Bolaños (1930–1999), Mexican actor
- Jonathan Bolaños (born 1978), Costa Rican footballer
- Jorge Bolaños (born 1936), Cuban politician and diplomat
- José Miguel Corrales Bolaños (born 1938), Costa Rican politician
- Juan Carlos Bolaños (born 1946), Mexican racing driver
- Luis Bolaños (born 1985), Ecuadorian footballer
- Luis de Bolaños (c. 1540–1629), Spanish Franciscan friar and missionary evangelist
- Meisi Bolaños (born 1970), Cuban politician
- Miller Bolaños (born 1990), Ecuadorian footballer
- Otto Bolaños (born 1983), Colombian vert skater
- Ronald Bolaños (born 1996), Cuban baseball player
- Roberto Gómez Bolaños "Chespirito" (1929–2014), Mexican writer, actor, director, comedian
