= Bolaños River =

Coordinates: 22.09699°N 103.61058°W

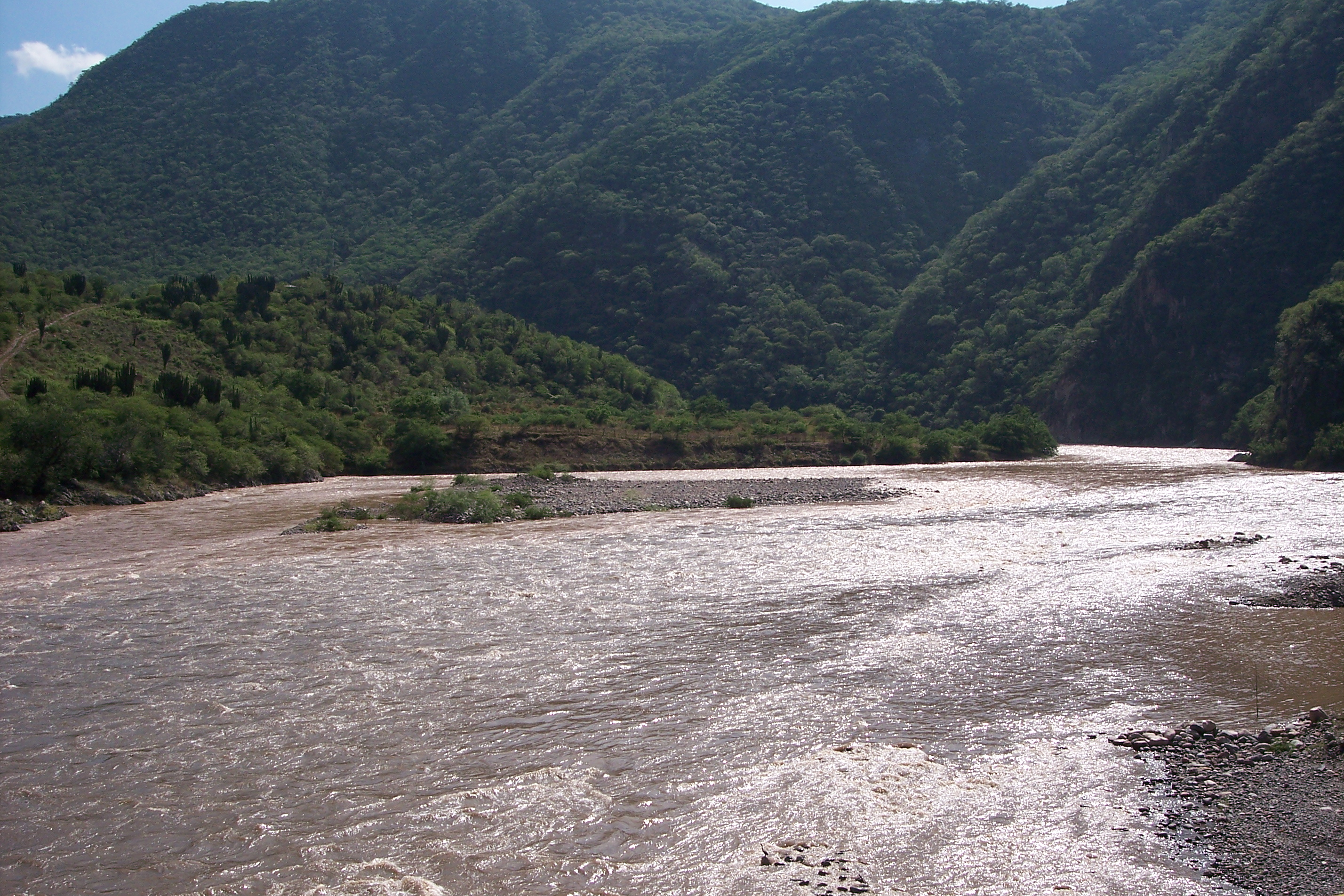
- The Bolaños River as it reaches the Lerma Santiago River

Location
- Country: Mexico

Physical characteristics
- Source
  - location: Zacatecas
- Mouth
  - location: Lerma Santiago River
- Length: 360 km (220 mi)
- Basin size: Lerma Santiago River

The Bolaños River is a river in Mexico flowing through the Sierra Madre Occidental, and a tributary of Río Grande de Santiago. It has a length of 360 km (220 mi) and a watershed of about 10,000 km^{2} (3,900 sq mi).

== Geography ==
The river's origin is in the state of Zacatecas, about 60 km (37 mi) west of the city of Fresnillo, about 40 km (25 mi) south of Tropic of Cancer. It flows south between the Sierra los Huicholes on the west and the Sierra de Morones on the east. It enters the state of Jalisco some 85 km (53 mi) later, eventually draining into the Lerma Santiago River, approximately 40 km (25 mi) northwest of the city of Tequila. The last 32 km (20 mi) of the river form the boundary between the states of Jalisco and Nayarit.

The principal municipalities transversed by the Bolaños River include:

- in Zacatecas: San Mateo and Valparaiso;
- in Jalisco: Mezquitic, Villa Guerrero, Bolaños, Chimaltitán and San Martín de Bolaños.

== See also ==
- List of rivers of Mexico
