= Otto Bolaños =

Colombian skater

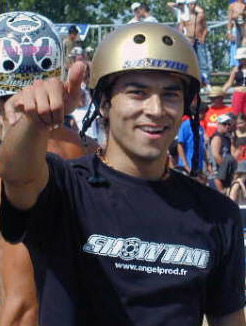

Personal information
- Nationality: Colombian
- Born: April 12, 1983 (age 43) Bogotá, Colombia
- Height: 5 ft 4 in (1.63 m)
- Weight: 140 lb (64 kg)

Sport
- Sport: Vert skating
Medal record
Competitions
Representing Colombia
Gold medal – first place	2005 Italian Rolling Contest	Vert

Otto Bolaños (born April 12, 1983) is a Colombian professional vert skater. He started skating when he was thirteen years old in 1996 and turned professional in 2004. He has attended many competitions in his vert skating career.

== Vert competitions ==
- 2007 LG Action Sports World Championships, Dallas, TX - Vert: 6th
- 2007 Action Sports World Tour, San Diego, CA - Vert: 8th
- 2007 Asian X Games, Shanghai - Vert: 7th
- 2005 Italian Rolling Contest - Vert: 1st
- 2005 Best Trick Rennes sur Roulettes - Vert: 1st
- 2004 Latin American X Games - Vert: 5th
