= Mezquitic =

- Municipality and town
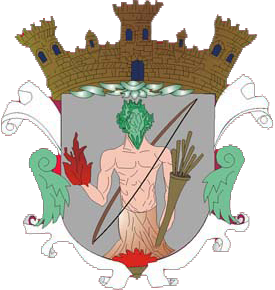
- Coat of arms

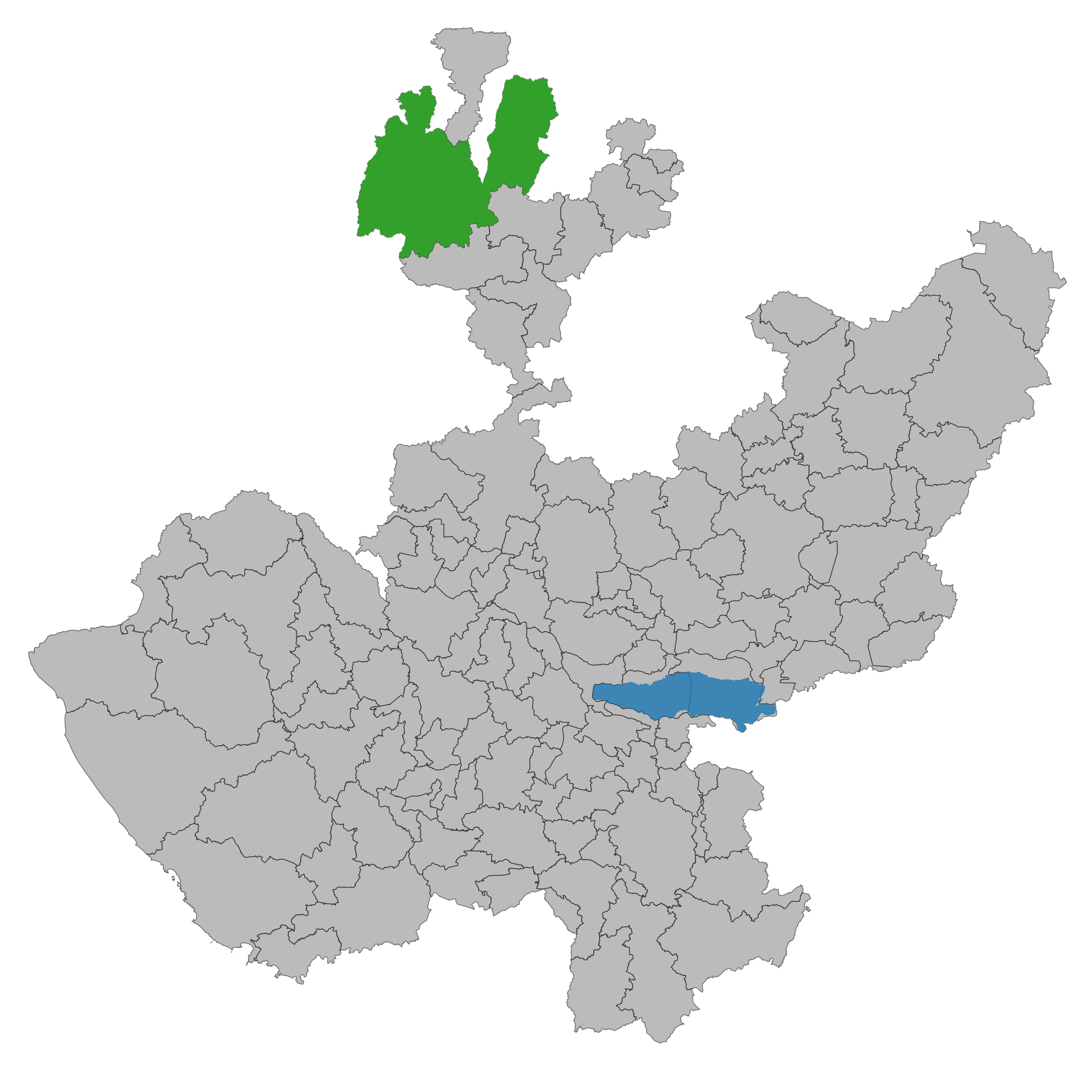
- Location of the municipality in Jalisco

- Location in Mexico Mezquitic (Mexico)
- Country: Mexico
- State: Jalisco

Government
  - Mayor: Misael Cruz de Haro

Area
  - Total: 3,364 km^{2} (1,299 sq mi)
  - Town: 1.28 km^{2} (0.49 sq mi)

Population (2020 census)
  - Total: 22,083
  - Density: 6.565/km^{2} (17.00/sq mi)
  - Town: 2,639
  - Town density: 2,060/km^{2} (5,340/sq mi)
- Time zone: UTC-6 (Central Standard Time)

Mezquitic Municipality is a municipality in the north of the state of Jalisco, Mexico, being the largest municipality in Jalisco.

It is bordered to the north east and west by the state of Zacatecas. It also shares its northern border with Huejuquilla el Alto Municipality and it shares its southern border with Villa Guerrero Municipality and Bolaños Municipality.

The municipality includes a number of autonomously governed Wixárika (Huichol) communities, including San Andrés Cohamiata.

The population in Mezquitic is predominantly Roman Catholic, while other denominations are present in the region like Jehovah Witness, as well as The Seventh-day Adventist church. Catholicism is primary religion in the region, as reflected in many religious festivities. Some of the main festivities that take place are the Feast of Saint John the Baptist who Patron Saint of the town which is celebrated on June 24, the feast of Virgin of Guadalupe celebrated on December 12 and Holy Week in which all week long there are different events taken place in the town and its outskirts. Some other festivities that take place that is not religiously based are the annual town festival that takes place from December 25 to December 31 and consists of various cultural and artistic events, regional sport tournaments, rodeos, and absentee day in which they celebrate those to immigrated to other parts of the country, or the United States but return annually for these festivities.
