= Bolaños de Campos =

Coordinates: 42°00′N 5°17′W

Bolaños de Campos, Spain
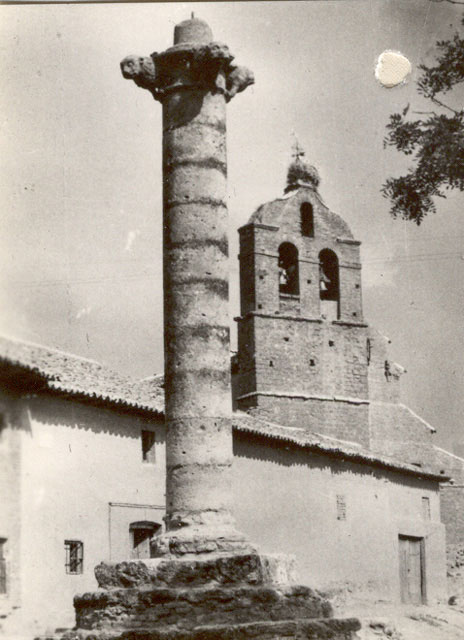
- Country: Spain
- Autonomous community: Castile and León
- Province: Valladolid
- Municipality: Bolaños de Campos

Area
  - Total: 30 km^{2} (12 sq mi)

Population (2025-01-01)
  - Total: 244
  - Density: 8.1/km^{2} (21/sq mi)
- Time zone: UTC+1 (CET)
  - Summer (DST): UTC+2 (CEST)

Bolaños de Campos is a municipality located in the province of Valladolid, Castile and León, Spain. According to the 2004 census (INE), the municipality has a population of 399 inhabitants.
