= Tuxpan de Bolaños =

Tuxpan de Bolaños Kuruxi Manúwe (Wixárika language)
- Native Community
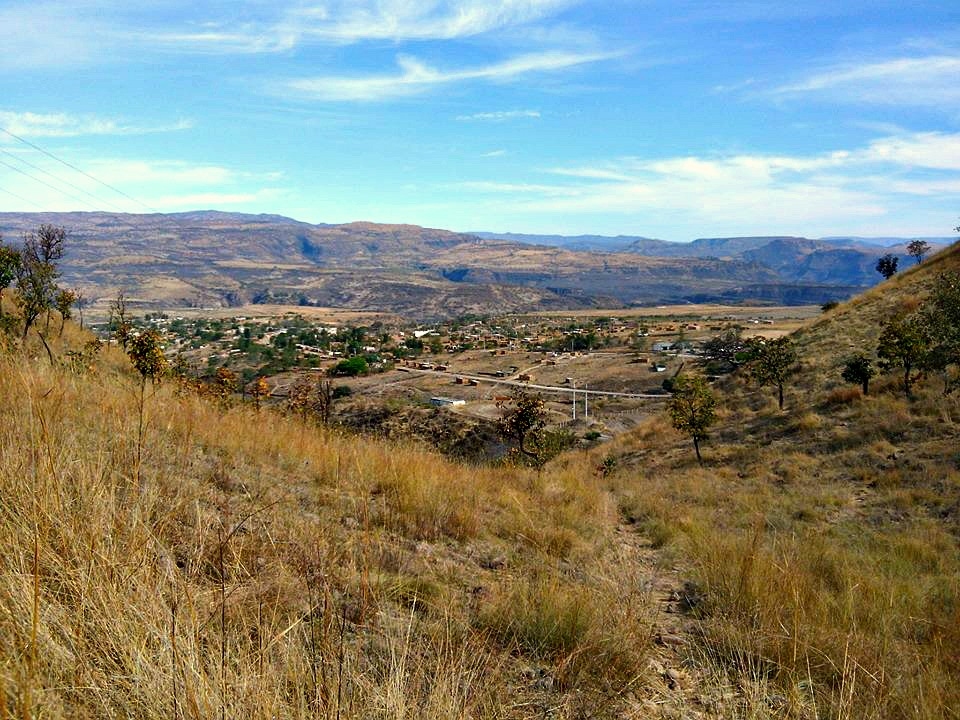
- Outlook

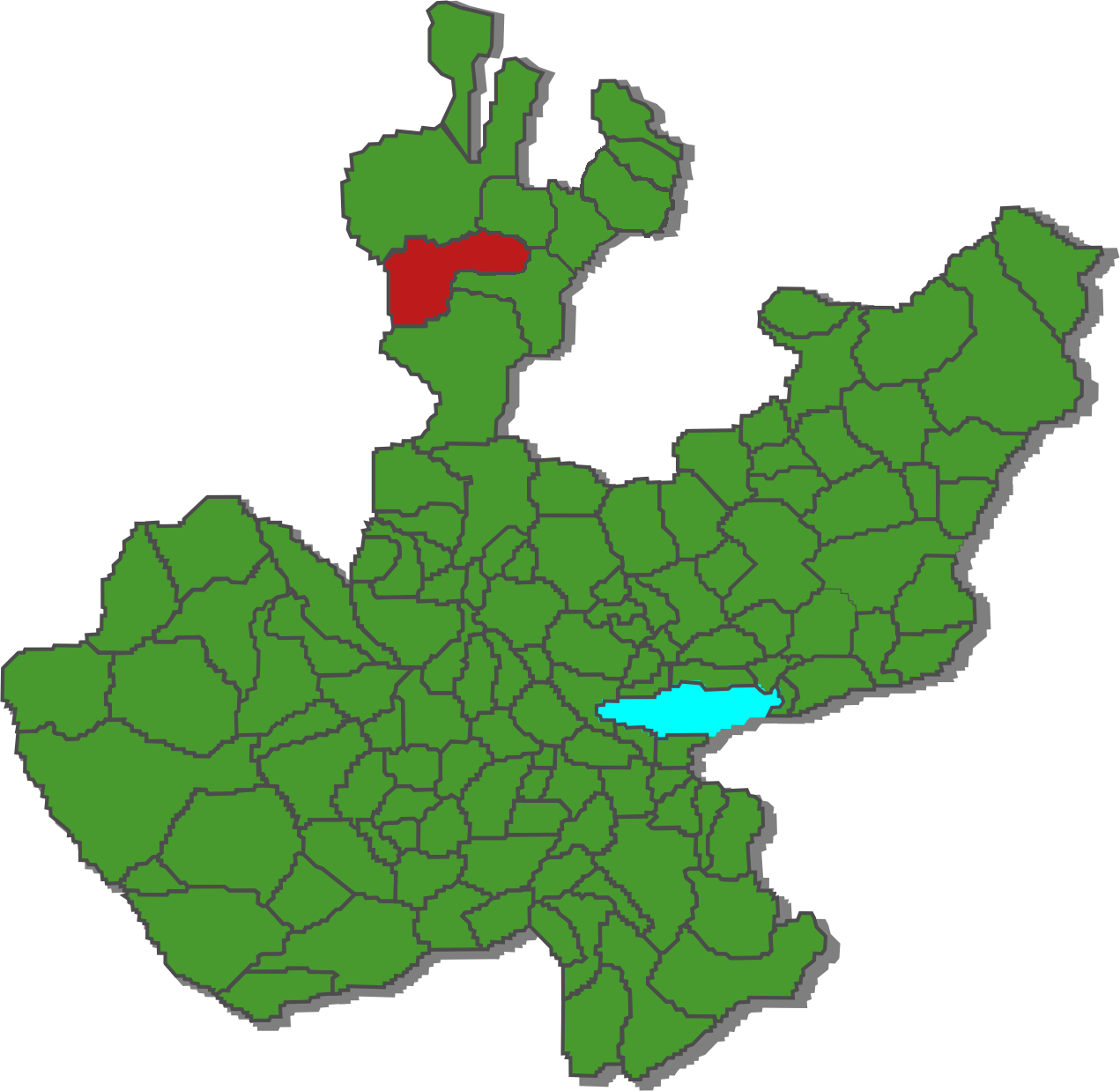
- Location within the state of Jalisco

- Location in Mexico
- Coordinates: 21.875°N 104.013°W
- Country: Mexico
- State: Jalisco
- Municipal seat: Bolaños
- Native Community: Tuxpan de Bolaños
- Elevation: 1,120 m (3,670 ft)

Population (2010)
  - Total: 1,269
- Time zone: UTC−06:00 (CST)

Tuxpan de Bolaños is a Huichol settlement in the Bolaños Municipality of Jalisco, Mexico. In the Huichol language, it is named as Kuruxi Manúka. According to INEGI in 2010, its population was 1269. According to the Huichol people, the population of Tuxpan de Bolaños is roughly 2,000 people.

Other communities belonging to the same culture are Santa Catarina Cuexcomatitlan (Tuapurie), San Sebastian Teponahuaxtlán (Wautia), San Andres Cohamiata (Tatei Kie) and San Miguel Huaixtita (Tsikwaita), within the state of Jalisco and Guadalupe Ocotán (Xatsitsarie) in the state of Nayarit.
