= San Martín de Bolaños =

- Municipality and town
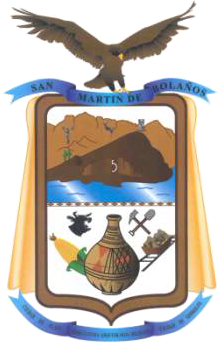
- Coat of arms

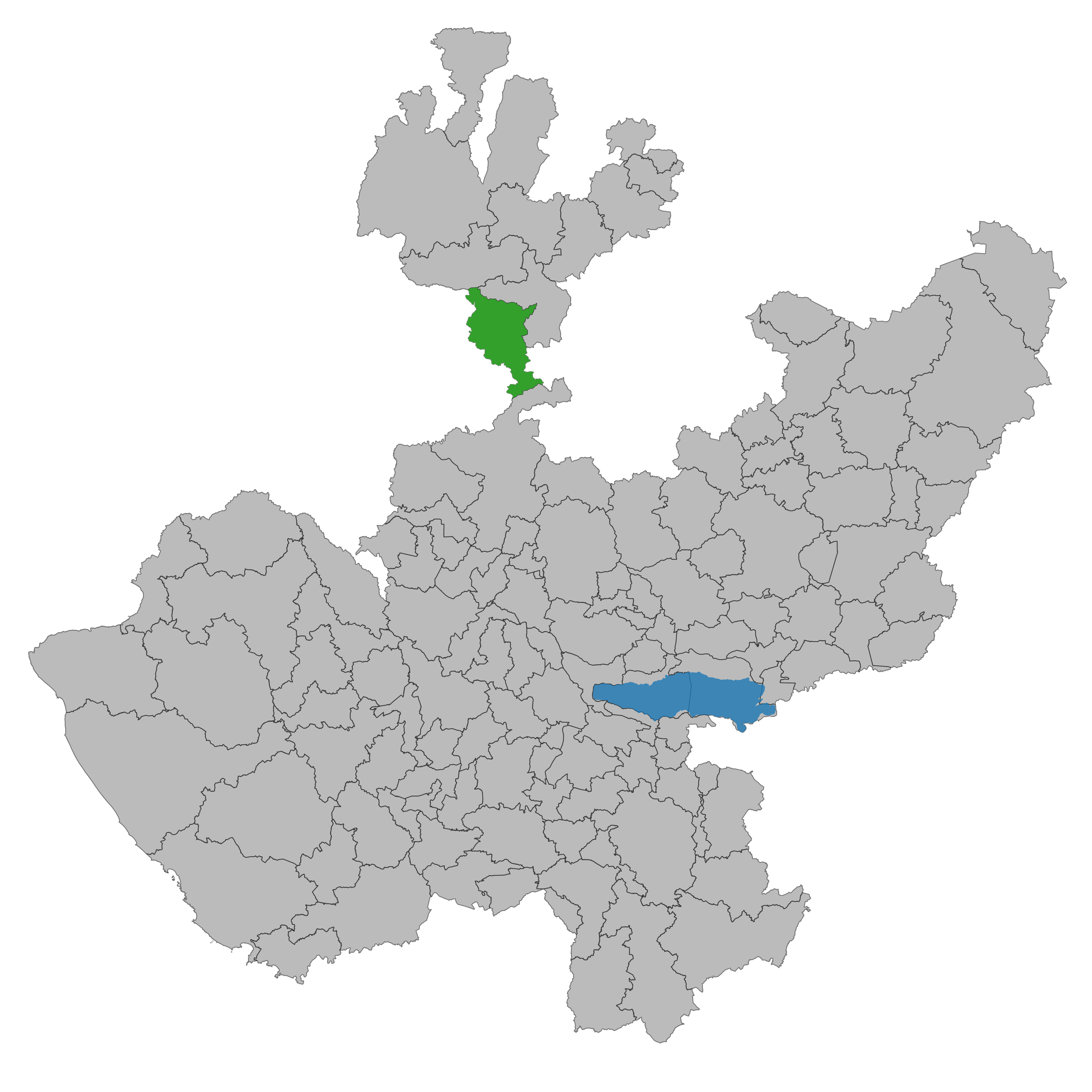
- Location of the municipality in Jalisco

- Location in Mexico
- Coordinates: 21°30′N 103°48′W
- Country: Mexico
- State: Jalisco

Area
  - Total: 690.1 km^{2} (266.4 sq mi)
  - Town: 0.79 km^{2} (0.31 sq mi)

Population (2020 census)
  - Total: 3,095
  - Density: 4.485/km^{2} (11.62/sq mi)
  - Town: 2,138
  - Town density: 2,700/km^{2} (7,000/sq mi)
- Time zone: UTC-6 (Central Standard Time)

San Martín de Bolaños is a town and municipality, in Jalisco in central-western Mexico. The municipality covers an area of 690.1 km^{2}.

As of 2005, the municipality had a total population of 3,205.
