= Bolaños Municipality =

Bolaños
- Municipality
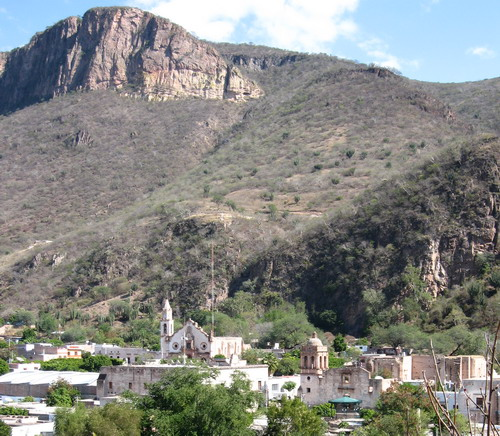

- Coat of arms

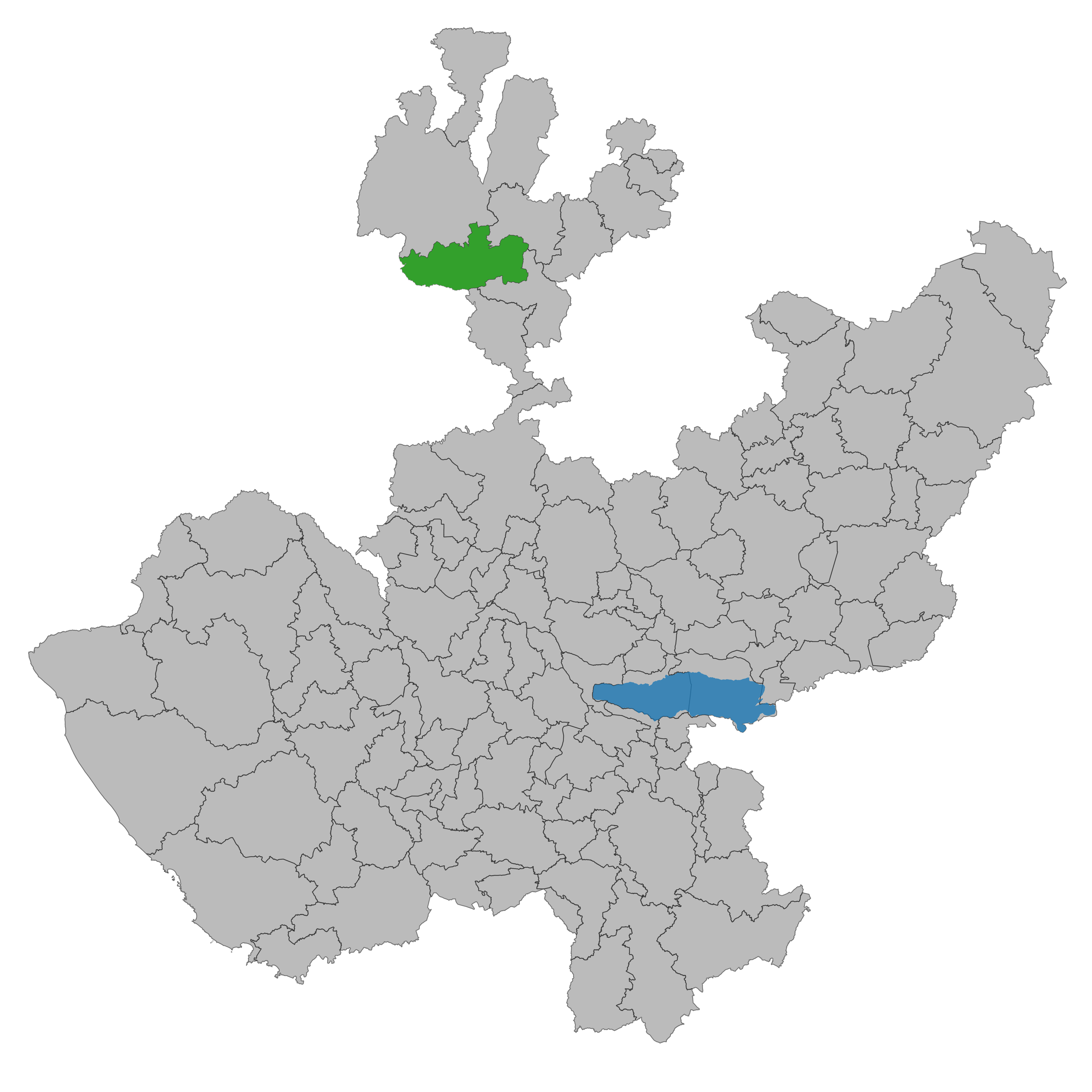
- Location within the state of Jalisco

- Location in Mexico Bolaños (Mexico)
- Coordinates: 21°49′50″N 103°46′50″W
- Country: Mexico
- State: Jalisco
- Municipal seat: Bolaños
- Founded: 1548 (Toribio de Bolaños)

Area
  - Total: 866.5 km^{2} (334.6 sq mi)
  - Seat: 0.28 km^{2} (0.11 sq mi)
- Elevation: 575 m (1,887 ft)

Population (2020 census)
  - Total: 7,043
  - Density: 8.128/km^{2} (21.05/sq mi)
  - Seat: 1,086
  - Seat density: 3,900/km^{2} (10,000/sq mi)
- Time zone: UTC-6 (Central (US Central))
- Postal code: 46101
- Area code: (52) 437
- Website: www.bolanoscolonial.com

Bolaños Municipality is a municipality in the north of the state of Jalisco in Mexico.

The municipality shares its border on the north with the municipalities of Mezquitic and Villa Guerrero and to the southeast with the municipality of Chimaltitán. To the south, it shares a border with the municipality of San Martín de Bolaños and to the southwest, it shares a border with the state of Nayarit.

== Geography ==
=== Climate ===
Bolaños is surrounded with mountains and semi-desert and due to its topographical position in the canyon, Bolaños is often very hot.

== Population ==
The population of Bolaños totaled 5,019 inhabitants according to the 2005 census. Of these, 826 lived in the municipal seat and the remainder lived in other communities within the municipality. The community with the largest population within the municipality is not the municipal seat, but rather Tuxpán de Bolaños which is an autonomous Wixárika (Huichol) village with a population of 944 inhabitants. The municipality suffers one of the highest poverty rates in the state of Jalisco. More than 48 percent of its inhabitants spoke an indigenous language according to the census. Most of these would be speakers of Huichol who inhabit one of the numerous indigenous communities within the borders of the municipality, including Tuxpán de Bolaños.

Of the economically active population, the largest group is employed in agriculture and husbandry (21 percent). The second largest group is employed in industry and manufacturing (15 percent), followed by mining (13 percent).

== History ==
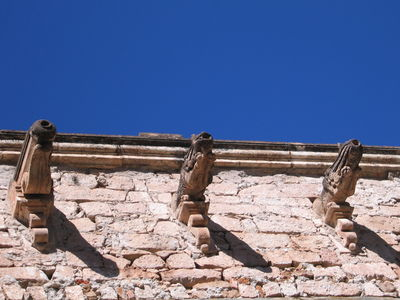
Architectural detail of early colonial home in Bolaños

Prior to the Spanish conquest, the municipality of Bolaños was inhabited by the indigenous Tepecan (Tepehuan). The area was conquered by the Spanish Captain Pedro Almíndez Chirino, sent by Nuño Beltrán de Guzmán in the year 1530. Shortly after the arrival of the Spanish into the area, the Huichol (Wixarika) migrated to the area's remote canyons and mountains.

The original Spanish land grantee in the region was Toribio de Bolaños, in whose honor the municipality was named. In 1548, he received a trusteeship (encomienda) for all of the indigenous inhabitants of the area and the right to mine silver. The mining operations lasted only a few years before they were shut down by indigenous rebellions. The area was not resettled until the early 17th century when the Franciscans founded a mission in Chimaltitán.

In 1730, a new vein of silver was discovered and a new mining camp was established near the existing camps of Tepec and Santa Rosa Alburquerque. In 1748, yet another vein was discovered near the old Bolaños mine by an indigenous man named José Barranco. Other mining discoveries included: La Cocina; La del Espíritu Santo, also known as La Conejera; El Parián; El Barranco or La Conquista; La Castellana; La Perla; Zapopan; La Montañesa; Los Laureles; and La Trinidad. Until 1780, Bolaños was one of the top three mining regions in New Spain.

The mining population in Bolaños reached upwards of 1,500 mine workers plus all of the ancillary labor. In 1792, the mines produced 120,166 marks and 4 ounces of silver. Around 1830, silver production dropped off dramatically, leading to a general economic depression in the region.

After the War of Independence, Bolaños was assigned to the 8th canton of the free and sovereign state of Jalisco. A decree published on 19 February 1833 officially made Bolaños a municipality.

== Sources ==
- Enciclopedia de los Municipios del Estado de Jalisco
- Nicolas Valdes Huerta, Historia de Villa Guerrero
- Instituto Nacional de Estadística, Geografía e Informática
