= Chimaltitán =

- Municipality
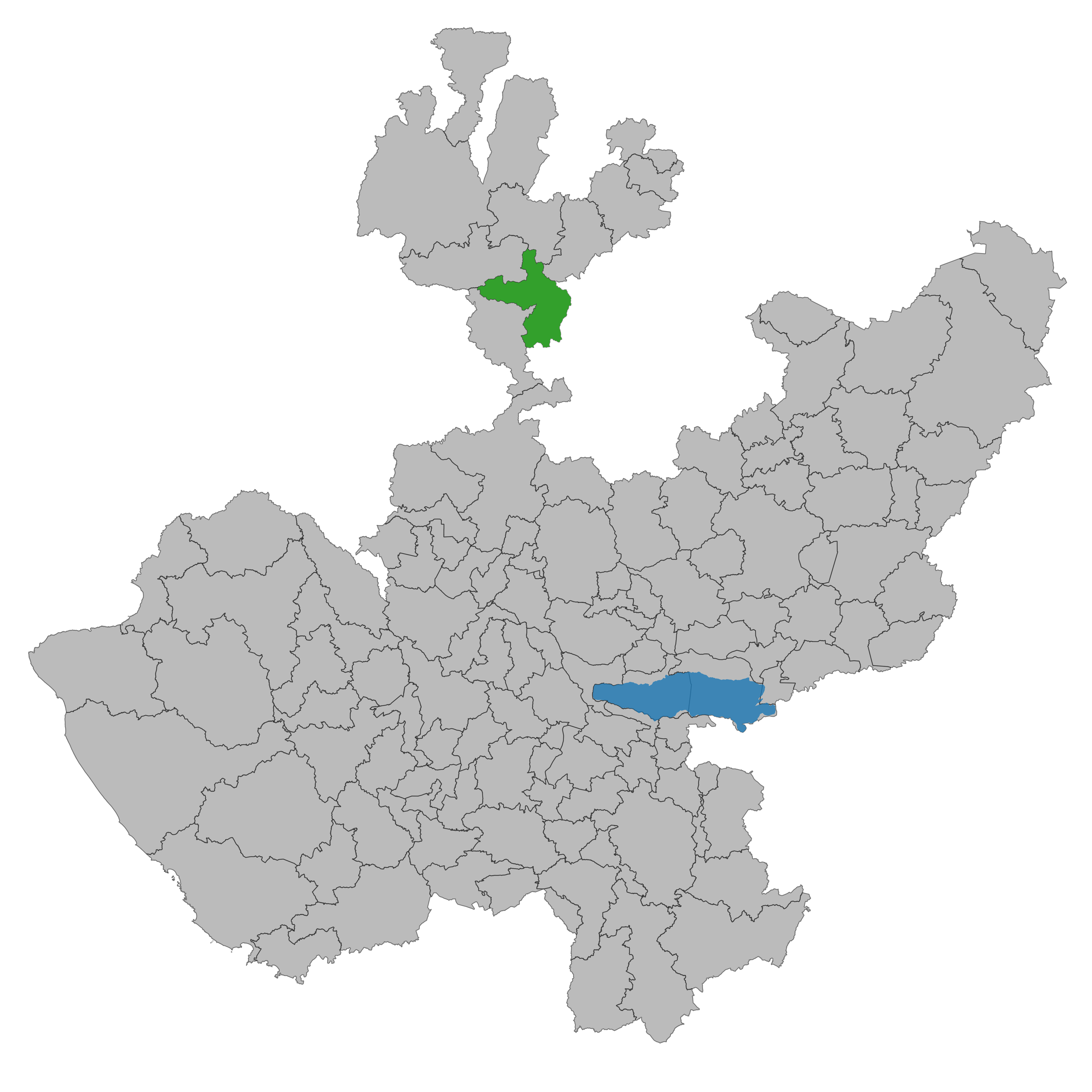
- Municipality location in Jalisco

- Location in Mexico
- Coordinates: 21°54′N 103°58′W
- Country: Mexico
- State: Jalisco

Government
  - Mayor: C. Marcos Miguel Bramasco Palacios

Area
  - Total: 655.1 km^{2} (252.9 sq mi)

Population (2005)
  - Total: 3,382
  - Density: 5.163/km^{2} (13.37/sq mi)
- Time zone: UTC-6 (Central (US Central))

Chimaltitán Municipality is a municipality in the north of the state of Jalisco, Mexico.

== Borders ==
It is bordered on the north by Totatiche Municipality and Villa Guerrero Municipality, to the east by the state of Zacatecas, to the south by San Martín de Bolaños Municipality and to the west by Bolaños Municipality.
