= Huejuquilla El Alto =

- Municipality and town
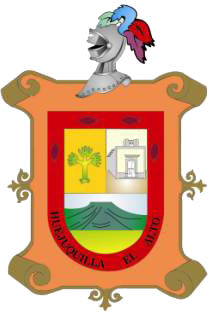
- Coat of arms

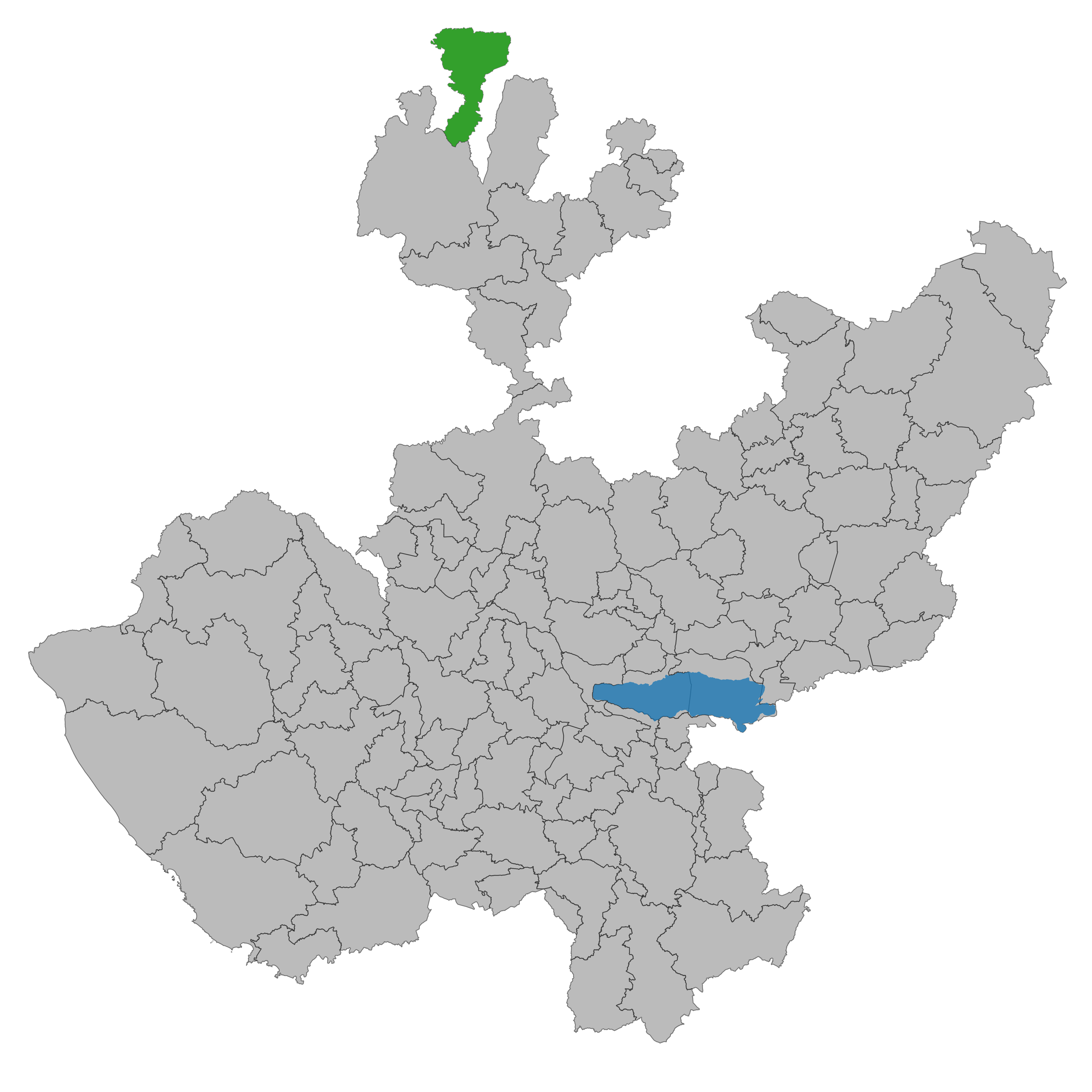
- Location of the municipality in Jalisco

- Location in Mexico
- Coordinates: 22°37′32″N 103°53′47″W
- Country: Mexico
- State: Jalisco

Area
  - Total: 769.5 km^{2} (297.1 sq mi)
  - Town: 3.1 km^{2} (1.2 sq mi)

Population (2020 census)
  - Total: 10,015
  - Density: 13.01/km^{2} (33.71/sq mi)
  - Town: 5,949
  - Town density: 1,900/km^{2} (5,000/sq mi)

Huejuquilla El Alto is a town and municipality in Jalisco in central-western Mexico, being the northernmost municipality in Jalisco. The municipality covers an area of 769.5 km^{2}.

As of 2005, the municipality had a total population of 7,926.

== Climate ==
Climate data for Huejuquilla El Alto (1991–2020 normals, extremes 1986–2019)
Month	Jan	Feb	Mar	Apr	May	Jun	Jul	Aug	Sep	Oct	Nov	Dec	Year
Record high °C (°F)	31 (88)	32.5 (90.5)	32.5 (90.5)	38 (100)	38 (100)	38.5 (101.3)	37 (99)	33 (91)	34 (93)	33 (91)	30 (86)	34 (93)	38.5 (101.3)
Mean daily maximum °C (°F)	21.6 (70.9)	23.2 (73.8)	24.0 (75.2)	27.5 (81.5)	29.9 (85.8)	29.3 (84.7)	26.5 (79.7)	26.1 (79.0)	25.5 (77.9)	25.2 (77.4)	23.4 (74.1)	21.7 (71.1)	25.3 (77.5)
Daily mean °C (°F)	11.1 (52.0)	12.4 (54.3)	13.8 (56.8)	16.4 (61.5)	19.0 (66.2)	20.3 (68.5)	18.6 (65.5)	18.2 (64.8)	17.6 (63.7)	16.2 (61.2)	13.4 (56.1)	11.5 (52.7)	15.7 (60.3)
Mean daily minimum °C (°F)	0.7 (33.3)	1.6 (34.9)	3.6 (38.5)	5.4 (41.7)	8.2 (46.8)	11.4 (52.5)	10.7 (51.3)	10.3 (50.5)	9.7 (49.5)	7.1 (44.8)	3.3 (37.9)	1.3 (34.3)	6.1 (43.0)
Record low °C (°F)	−8 (18)	−11 (12)	−5.5 (22.1)	−2 (28)	0 (32)	0 (32)	0 (32)	0 (32)	0 (32)	0 (32)	−8 (18)	−9 (16)	−11 (12)
Average precipitation mm (inches)	5.7 (0.22)	9.0 (0.35)	4.4 (0.17)	4.6 (0.18)	4.6 (0.18)	58.1 (2.29)	108.8 (4.28)	96.4 (3.80)	93.2 (3.67)	40.9 (1.61)	7.1 (0.28)	6.6 (0.26)	439.4 (17.30)
Average rainy days	0.9	1.0	0.5	0.6	0.9	6.8	12.7	11.6	9.9	4.2	1.1	1.1	51.3
Source: Servicio Meteorológico Nacional
