= Bolaños, Jalisco =

Town of Jalisco State, Mexico

Bolaños is the municipal seat of Bolaños Municipality, Jalisco, Mexico. The population was 1,086 according to the 2020 census.

== Climate ==
Climate data for Bolaños, Jalisco (1991–2020 normals, extremes 1947–present)
Month	Jan	Feb	Mar	Apr	May	Jun	Jul	Aug	Sep	Oct	Nov	Dec	Year
Record high °C (°F)	40.5 (104.9)	47 (117)	48.5 (119.3)	49.5 (121.1)	49 (120)	49 (120)	46.5 (115.7)	45 (113)	46 (115)	47.5 (117.5)	45.5 (113.9)	40 (104)	49.5 (121.1)
Mean daily maximum °C (°F)	30.2 (86.4)	33.0 (91.4)	36.2 (97.2)	38.6 (101.5)	40.1 (104.2)	38.0 (100.4)	34.2 (93.6)	34.3 (93.7)	34.0 (93.2)	34.3 (93.7)	32.6 (90.7)	30.0 (86.0)	34.6 (94.3)
Daily mean °C (°F)	19.8 (67.6)	21.9 (71.4)	24.4 (75.9)	26.8 (80.2)	29.2 (84.6)	29.4 (84.9)	27.0 (80.6)	27.0 (80.6)	26.7 (80.1)	25.6 (78.1)	22.6 (72.7)	20.0 (68.0)	25.0 (77.0)
Mean daily minimum °C (°F)	9.5 (49.1)	10.9 (51.6)	12.5 (54.5)	15.0 (59.0)	18.4 (65.1)	20.9 (69.6)	19.7 (67.5)	19.6 (67.3)	19.4 (66.9)	16.9 (62.4)	12.7 (54.9)	9.9 (49.8)	15.4 (59.7)
Record low °C (°F)	−1 (30)	0.5 (32.9)	4 (39)	5 (41)	5 (41)	4 (39)	4 (39)	3 (37)	3 (37)	1 (34)	1 (34)	2 (36)	−1 (30)
Average precipitation mm (inches)	14.8 (0.58)	12.1 (0.48)	4.4 (0.17)	2.0 (0.08)	15.7 (0.62)	117.7 (4.63)	150.4 (5.92)	141.5 (5.57)	101.5 (4.00)	41.4 (1.63)	14.6 (0.57)	12.9 (0.51)	629.0 (24.76)
Average rainy days	2.1	1.4	0.8	0.6	2.5	13.0	19.1	18.2	14.5	7.5	2.6	2.0	84.3
Source: Servicio Meteorológico Nacional
