= 1st federal electoral district of Jalisco =

Federal electoral district of Mexico

Jalisco's 1st
- Electoral district of the Chamber of Deputies of Mexico

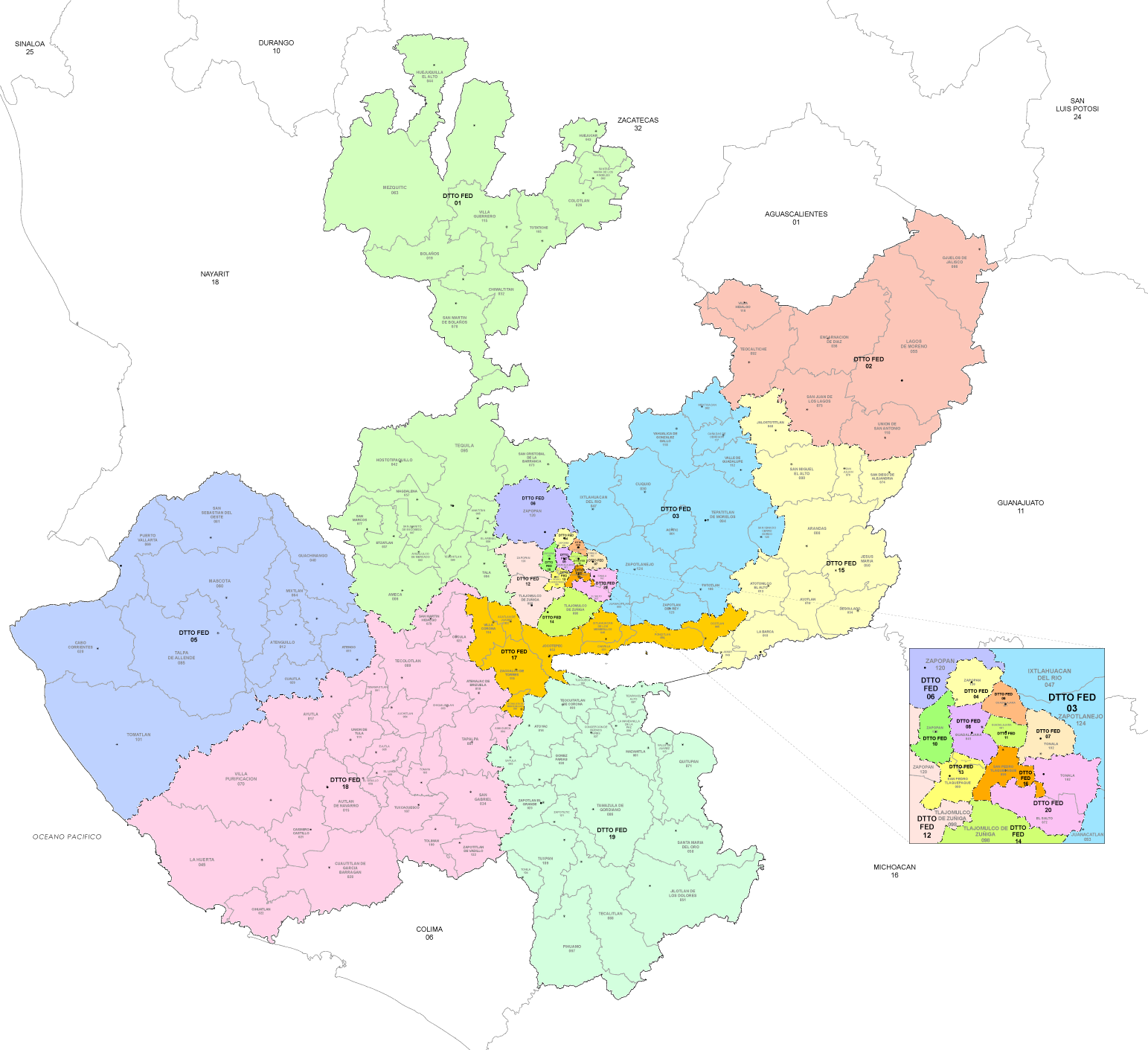
- 1st district

Incumbent
- Member: Javier Guízar Macías
- Party: ▌Labour Party
- Congress: 66th (2024–2027)

District
- State: Jalisco
- Head town: Tequila
- Coordinates: 20°53′N 103°50′W
- Covers: 23 municipalities: Ahualulco de Mercado, Amatitán, Ameca, Bolaños, Chimaltitán, Colotlán, El Arenal, Etzatlán, Hostotipaquillo, Huejúcar, Huejuquilla El Alto, Magdalena, Mezquitic, San Cristóbal de la Barranca, San Juanito de Escobedo, San Marcos, San Martín de Bolaños, Santa María de los Ángeles, Tala, Tequila, Teuchitlán, Totatiche, Villa Guerrero
- PR region: First
- Precincts: 250
- Population: 413,905 (2020 census)

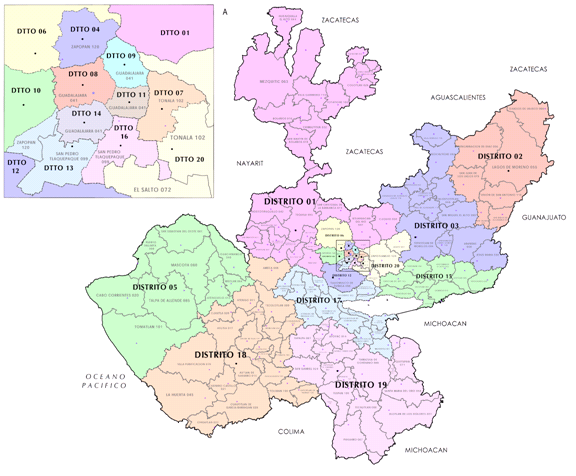
Jalisco's districts in 2017–2022

The 1st federal electoral district of Jalisco (Spanish: Distrito electoral federal 01 de Jalisco) is one of the 300 electoral districts into which Mexico is divided for elections to the federal Chamber of Deputies and one of 20 such districts in the state of Jalisco.

It elects one deputy to the lower house of Congress for each three-year legislative session by means of the first-past-the-post system. Votes cast in the district also count towards the calculation of proportional representation ("plurinominal") deputies elected from the first region.

The current member for the district, elected in the 2024 general election, is Francisco Javier Guízar Macías of the Labour Party (PT).

== District territory ==
Under the 2023 districting plan adopted by the National Electoral Institute (INE), which is to be used for the 2024, 2027 and 2030 federal elections, the 1st district covers the northern part of Jalisco, between the states of Nayarit and Zacatecas, and comprises 250 electoral precincts (secciones electorales) across 23 of the state's 125 municipalities:

- Ahualulco de Mercado, Amatitán, Ameca, Bolaños, Chimaltitán, Colotlán, El Arenal, Etzatlán, Hostotipaquillo, Huejúcar, Huejuquilla El Alto, Magdalena, Mezquitic, San Cristóbal de la Barranca, San Juanito de Escobedo, San Marcos, San Martín de Bolaños, Santa María de los Ángeles, Tala, Tequila, Teuchitlán, Totatiche and Villa Guerrero.

The head town (cabecera distrital), where results from individual polling stations are gathered together and tallied, is the city of Tequila. The district reported a population of 413,905 in the 2020 census.

== Previous districting schemes ==
Evolution of electoral district numbers
	1974	1978	1996	2005	2017	2023
Jalisco	13	20	19	19	20	20
Chamber of Deputies	196	300				

2017–2022

Jalisco regained its 20th congressional seat in the 2017 redistricting process. The 1st district's head town was at Tequila and it covered 24 municipalities in the north of the state:
- Ahualulco de Mercado, Amatitán, Bolaños, Chimaltitán, Colotlán, Cuquío, El Arenal, Etzatlán, Hostotipaquillo, Huejúcar, Huejuquilla El Alto, Ixtlahuacán del Río, Magdalena, Mezquitic, San Cristóbal de la Barranca, San Juanito de Escobedo, San Marcos, San Martín de Bolaños, Santa María de los Ángeles, Tala, Tequila, Teuchitlán, Totatiche and Villa Guerrero.

2005–2017

Under the 2005 plan, Jalisco had 19 districts. This district's head town was at Tequila and it covered 24 of the state's northern municipalities:
- Ahualulco de Mercado, Amatitán, Bolaños, Chimaltitán, Colotlán, Cuquío, El Arenal, Etzatlán, Hostotipaquillo, Huejúcar, Huejuquilla El Alto, Ixtlahuacán del Río, Magdalena, Mezquitic, San Cristóbal de la Barranca, San Juanito de Escobedo, San Marcos, San Martín de Bolaños, Santa María de los Ángeles, Tala, Tequila, Teuchitlán, Totatiche and Villa Guerrero.

1996–2005

In the 1996 scheme, under which Jalisco lost a single-member seat, the district had its head town at Tequila and it comprised 21 municipalities:
- Ahualulco de Mercado, Amatitán, Antonio Escobedo, Bolaños, Chimaltitán, Colotlán, El Arenal, Etzatlán, Hostotipaquillo, Huejúcar, Huejuquilla El Alto, Magdalena, Mezquitic, San Marcos, San Martín de Bolaños, Santa María de los Ángeles, Tala, Tequila, Teuchitlán, Totatiche and Villa Guerrero.

1978–1996

The districting scheme in force from 1978 to 1996 was the result of the 1977 electoral reforms, which increased the number of single-member seats in the Chamber of Deputies from 196 to 300. Under that plan, Jalisco's seat allocation rose from 13 to 20. The 1st district covered a part of the sector Hidalgo in the state capital, Guadalajara.

== Deputies returned to Congress ==
(Mexico) National parties
- Current
- PAN
- PRI
- PT
- PVEM
- MC
- Morena
- PAZ
- Somos
- Defunct or local only
- PLM
- PNR
- PRM
- PNM
- PP
- PPS
- PARM
- PFCRN
- CON
- PANAL
- PSD
- PES
- PES
- PRD

Jalisco's 1st district
Election	Deputy	Party	Term	Legislature
1916	Luis Manuel Rojas		1916–1917	Constituent Congress of Querétaro
...
1976	Guillermo Cosío Vidaurri	Institutional Revolutionary Party	1976–1979	50th Congress
1979	Eduardo Aviña Batiz	Institutional Revolutionary Party	1979–1982	51st Congress
1982	José Luis Lamadrid Sauza	Institutional Revolutionary Party	1982–1985	52nd Congress
1985	Santiago Camarena Flores	Institutional Revolutionary Party	1985–1988	53rd Congress
1988	Blanca Leticia Escoto	National Action Party (Mexico)	1988–1991	54th Congress
1991	Jorge Leobardo Lepe García	National Action Party (Mexico)	1991–1994	55th Congress
1994	Juan Manuel Pérez Corona	National Action Party (Mexico)	1994–1997	56th Congress
1997	Teresa Núñez Casas	Institutional Revolutionary Party	1997–2000	57th Congress
2000	Jaime Hernández González	Institutional Revolutionary Party	2000–2003	58th Congress
2003	Francisco Javier Guízar Macías	Institutional Revolutionary Party	2003–2006	59th Congress
2006	Gustavo Macías Zambrano	National Action Party (Mexico)	2006–2009	60th Congress
2009	Ignacio Téllez González	National Action Party (Mexico)	2009–2012	61st Congress
2012	Cesario Padilla Navarro	Institutional Revolutionary Party	2012–2015	62nd Congress
2015	Hugo Daniel Gaeta Esparza	Institutional Revolutionary Party	2015–2018	63rd Congress
2018	Eduardo Ron Ramos	Citizens' Movement (Mexico)	2018–2021	64th Congress
2021	Gustavo Macías Zambrano	National Action Party (Mexico)	2021–2024	65th Congress
2024	Francisco Javier Guízar Macías	Labour Party (Mexico)	2024–2027	66th Congress

== Presidential elections ==
Election	District won by	Party or coalition	%
2018	Andrés Manuel López Obrador	Juntos Haremos Historia	41.8312
2024	Claudia Sheinbaum Pardo	Sigamos Haciendo Historia	49.9810
