= Región Valles =

- Intrastate region of Jalisco
- Country: Mexico
- State: Jalisco
- Established: August 3, 1998
- Seat: Ameca
- Largest town: Tala

Area
  - Total: 5,891 km^{2} (2,275 sq mi)

Population (2010)
  - Total: 345,438
  - Density: 58.64/km^{2} (151.9/sq mi)

Región Valles is the eleventh administrative region of the Mexican state of Jalisco. Its seat is the city of Ameca. The region is composed of 14 municipalities.

The region's agricultural crops include maize, chickpea, sugar cane, agave, wheat, and sorghum. Fishing is only for regional supply. Minerals mined in the area are gold, silver, kaolin, quartz, feldspar, baryta, zinc, copper, lead, opal, and fluorite.

== Municipalities ==
Municipality code	Name	Population		Land area			Population density	
Municipality code	Name	2020	Rank	km^{2}	sq mi	Rank	2020	Rank
003	Ahualulco de Mercado	23,630	4	235	91	8	101/km^{2} (260/sq mi)	4
005	Amatitán	16,490	8	216	83	9	76/km^{2} (198/sq mi)	5
006	Ameca	60,386	2	784	303	2	77/km^{2} (199/sq mi)	5
009	El Arenal	21,115	6	137	53	12	154/km^{2} (399/sq mi)	1
036	Etzatlán	20,011	7	388	150	5	52/km^{2} (134/sq mi)	7
040	Hostotipaquillo	8,732	11	720	280	6	12/km^{2} (31/sq mi)	12
055	Magdalena	21,781	5	344	133	6	63/km^{2} (164/sq mi)	6
007	San Juanito de Escobedo	9,433	10	198	76	11	48/km^{2} (123/sq mi)	8
075	San Marcos	3,791	12	262	101	7	14/km^{2} (37/sq mi)	11
083	Tala	87,690	1	630	240	4	139/km^{2} (361/sq mi)	2
094	Tequila	44,353	3	1,233	476	1	36/km^{2} (93/sq mi)	10
095	Teuchitlán	9,647	9	211	81	10	46/km^{2} (118/sq mi)	9
	Valles Region	327,059	—	5,358	2,068.74	—	61/km^{2} (158/sq mi)	—
Source: INEGI

=== Largest cities ===
Largest cities or towns in Valles Region Source:
Rank		Municipality	Pop.
1	Tala	Tala	40,906
2	Ameca	Ameca	37,871
3	Tequila	Tequila	31,115
4	Ahualulco de Mercado	Ahualulco de Mercado	17,000
5	Magdalena	Magdalena	16,873
6	Los Ruiseñores	Tala	15,519
7	Etzatlán	Etzatlán	14,697
8	El Arenal	El Arenal	12,438
9	Amatitán	Amatitán	12,180
10	San Juanito de Escobedo	San Juanito de Escobedo	5,595
