= Escobedo =

Escobedo may refer to:

== Places ==
- Escobedo, Camargo, Cantabria, Spain
- General Escobedo, Nuevo León, Mexico
- Escobedo, Coahuila, Mexico
- Empalme Escobedo, Guanajuato, Mexico
- Pedro Escobedo, Querétaro, Mexico
- San Juanito de Escobedo (municipality), Jalisco, Mexico
- Tanquián de Escobedo, San Luis Potosí, Mexico
- Tultitlán de Mariano Escobedo, México State, Mexico
- Mariano Escobedo, Veracruz, Mexico
- Monte Escobedo, Zacatecas, Mexico

== People with the surname ==
- Anna Escobedo Cabral (born 1959), 42nd Treasurer of the United States
- Bartolomé de Escobedo (c. 1500 - 1563), Spanish composer
- Belissa Escobedo (born 1988), American actress
- Carlos Escobedo, the founder of Spanish alternative rock band Savia
- Cleto Escobedo III (1966–2025), founder of Cleto and the Cletones, the house band on Jimmy Kimmel Live!
- Eduardo Escobedo (born 1984), Mexican professional boxer and WBC Silver Super Featherweight Champion
- Ernesto Escobedo (born 1996), American tennis player
- Helen Escobedo (c. 1934 - 2010), Mexican sculptor and installation artist
- José Antonio Chang Escobedo (born 1958), Prime Minister of Peru from September 2010 to March 2011
- Juan de Escobedo (c. 1530 - 1578), Spanish politician
- Marcos Escobedo (c. 1784 – 1833), Mexican military commander in the Mexican War of Independence, and later mayor of Colotlán, Jalisco
- Mariano Escobedo (c. 1826 - 1902), Mexican army general
- Marisela Ortiz Escobedo (1958–2010), Mexican social activist
- Rodrigo de Escobedo (†1493), Spanish notary on the first voyage of Christopher Columbus, taking minutes of the Discovery of America
- Vicente Escobedo (born 1981), Mexican-American boxer
- Xóchitl Escobedo (born 1968), Mexican tennis player

== Other uses ==
- Escobedo v. Illinois, 378 U.S. 478 (1964), a United States Supreme Court case dealing with criminal suspects' rights to counsel
- General Mariano Escobedo International Airport, an international airport located in Apodaca, Nuevo León, Mexico
- UM Escobedo, a Spanish football team based in Escobedo, Camargo, Cantabria, Spain
