= List of municipal presidents of Etzatlán =

Following is a list of municipal presidents of Etzatlán, in the Mexican state of Jalisco

Municipal president	Term	Political party	Notes
Ignacio Alonso	1864		
Silverio Romero	1864		
Policarpio Macías	1864		
Homobono Cambero	1864		
Luciano Meza	1867		
Hermenegildo Ortiz	1867		
Jesús G. Ibarra	1867		
Miguel L. Romero	1867		
Silvano Hernández	1867		
Mario Manzano	1868		
Ramón Blanco	1870		
Jesús Hermosillo	1871		
Pablo Falcón	1871		
Felipe Falcón	1871		
Silverio Romero	1871		
Lázaro García	1871		
Leonardo Sánchez	1871		
Felipe Fernández	1871		
L. Romero	1871		
Antonio Alonso	1871		
Pablo Partida	1871		
Antonio Alonso	1871		
Pablo Partida	1871		
Antonio Alonso	1871		
Adrián Fernández	1871		
Guadalupe Aguilar	1872		
Marcelino Rodríguez	1872		
Guadalupe Aguilar	1872		
Daniel L. de la Peña	1872		
Jesús Hermosillo	1872		
Leonardo Romero	1873		
Guillermo del Valle	1873		
Jesús González Ibarra	1873		
G. L. Patiño	1874–1875		
Antonio Fernández	1875		
G. L. Patiño	1875		
Refugio Partida	1876		
Miguel Romero	1876		
J. Refugio Partida	1876		
Miguel L. de la Peña	1876		
Leonardo Romero	1876		
Jesús L. Patiño	1877		
Miguel de la Peña	1877		
Ramón Blanco	1877		
José Blanco	1877		
Jesús Virgen	1878		
Alejandro Martínez	1879		
Marcelo Rodríguez	1880		
Esteban Alonso	1881		
Telésforo Ramos	1882		
Francisco Villaseñor	1883		
J. Refugio Partida	1884		
J. Refugio Partida	1886		
Miguel de la Peña	1886		
Leonardo Romero	1886		
Enrique Ocampo	1887		
José Blanco	1888		
Adrián Fernández	1888		
José Blanco	1888		
Adrián Fernández	1888		
José Blanco	1888		
Daniel R. Romero	1888		
Enrique Ocampo	1888		
Ramón Blanco	1888		
Ramón Villanueva	1889		
J. Refugio Partida	1889		
Adolfo E. Romero	1890		
Jesús González Ibarra	1890		
Adolfo E. Romero	1890		
Jesús González Ibarra	1891–1892		
José Blanco	1893		
Adolfo E. Romero	1893		
Jesús González Ibarra	1894		
Adolfo E. Romero	1894		
Francisco Cuevas	1895		
Jesús González Ibarra	1895		
Gabino Blanco	1895		
Francisco Cuevas	1895		
Amado Cristo	1896		
Leonardo Romero 1896	1896		
Jpsé Blanco	1896		
Leonardo Romero	1896		
Jesús G. Ibarra	1897		
Carlos Aldrete	1898		
Salvador Gómez, hijo	1898		
Carlos Aldrete	1898		
Jesús González Ibarra	1899		
Refugio Partida	1900		
José Blanco	1900		
Refugio Partida	1900		
Mariano Ramos	1901		
Jesús González Ibarra	1902		
Leonardo Romero	1903		
Jesús González Ibarra	1903		
Gabino Blanco	1904		
Leonardo Romero	1904		
Carlos Romero	1904		
José Blanco	1905		
Juan D. Casillas	1906		
José Blanco	1906		
Carlos Romero	1906		
Juan N. Soto	1907		
Luis Alonso	1907		
Juan N. Soto	1907		
Gabino Blanco	1908		
Carlos Romero	1908		
Luis Alonso	1909		
Carlos Romero	1909		
Gabino Blanco	1910		
Secundino García	1910–1911		
Jesús Medina	1911		
José María Díaz	1911		
Enrique Zepeda	1912		
Alberto Baeza	1912		
Carlos García Sánchez	1913		
Pascual Aurelio	1913		
Carlos García Ramos	1914		
Jesús González Ibarra	1914		
Librado Domínguez	1914		
Agustín Eguiarte	1914		
Librado Martínez	1915		
Manuel Romero	1915		
Agustín Eguiarte	1915–1916		
Jesús González Ibarra	1916		
José G. Martínez	1916		
José María Briseño	1916		
José G. Calderón	1917		
Lorenzo G. Calderón	1917		
José María Briseño	1917		
José G. Martínez	1917		
Toribio Preciado Arce	1918		
Jesús J. López de Nava	1918		
J. L. Cárdenas	1918		
Roberto Blanco Partida	1919		
Ramón Blanco	1919		
Roberto Romero	1920		
Secundino García	1920		
Ramón Blanco	1920		
Jesús G. Ibarra	1921		
Ramón Blanco	1922		
Daniel Velázquez	1923		
Ramón Blanco	1923		
Manuel Romero	1923–1924		
J. C. González	1924		
Ramón Blanco	1924		
Pedro Blanco Meza	1925		
Ramón Blanco	1925		
Daniel Velázquez	1926		
Ramón Blanco	1926		
Ramón Ramos Cuervo	1927		
Ramón Blanco	1928		
Ramón Ramos Cuervo	1928–1929		
Ramón Martínez	1929	PNR	
Everardo Topete	1930	PNR	
Ramón Martínez	1930	PNR	
José María Abundis	1930	PNR	
Everardo Topete	1931	PNR	
Ramón Ramos Cuervo	1932	PNR	
J. Antonio Partida	1933	PNR	
José Cárdenas Godina	1933	PNR	
Ramón Ramos Cuervo	1933	PNR	
Jorge Cárdenas Medina	1934	PNR	
Manuel Topete Peña	1934	PNR	
Juan Romero Ledesma	1935	PNR	
José María Zuzuárregui	1937–1938	PNR	
Zenón Ávalos	1938	PRM	
José Martínez	1939	PRM	
Pedro Blanco	1940	PRM	
Ramón Martínez	1940	PRM	
J. Jesús Blanco	1941	PRM	
Jesús Amador	1942	PRM	
Moisés Real Macías	1942	PRM	
Eleuterio Madrigal	1943	PRM	
Moisés Real Macías	1944	PRM	
Ignacio Ochoa Barajas	1944	PRM	
Ignacio Ochoa Barajas	1945	PRM	
J. Jesús Blanco	1946	PRI	
Aurelio Castillo	1947	PRI	
Francisco Siordia G.	1948	PRI	
Adán Romero Brambila	1948	PRI	
Francisco Siordia G.	1948–1951	PRI	
José Cárdenas Hernández	1953–1954	PRI	
Agustín Pérez Meza	1955–1958	PRI	
José Ma. Rodríguez	1959–1961	PRI	
Francisco Siordia	1962–1964	PRI	
Luis Vélez Valdés	1965–1967	PRI	
Roberto Blanco Z.	01-01-1968–31-12-1970	PRI	
Agustín Pérez Meza	1971–1973	PRI	
José María Zuzuárregui	1973–1975	PRI	
Luis Vélez Valdés	1975–1976	PRI	
Andrés Avelino Topete	01-01-1977–31-12-1979	PRI	
César Arvizu Gutiérrez	01-01-1980–31-12-1982	PRI	
Ausencio Huerta G.	01-01-1983–31-12-1985	PRI	
Fernando Gerardo López Pérez	01-01-1986–31-12-1988	PRI	
Arturo Ramos Romero	01-01-1989–1992	PRI	
Carlos César Sierra Romero	1992–1995	PRI	
Juan Manuel Chávez Jordán	1995–1997	PRI	
José Ricardo Ron Siordia	01-01-1998–31-12-2000	PRI	
Vicente Rentería Loza	01-01-2001–2003	PAN	Applied for a leave
Marina Barbosa Pérez	2003	PAN	Acting municipal president
Vicente Rentería Loza	2003–31-12-2003	PAN	Resumed
Juan Manuel Chávez Jordán	01-01-2004–31-12-2006	PRI	
Ignacio Téllez González	01-01-2007–2009	PAN	Applied for a leave
Alberto Navarrete Navarro	2009	PAN	Acting municipal president
Ignacio Téllez González	2009	PAN	Resumed
Luis Manuel Vélez Fregoso	01-01-2010–30-09-2012	PVEM	
Bonifacio Romero Velador	01-10-2012–30-09-2015	PAN	
Eduardo Ron Ramos	01-10-2015–30-09-2018	MC	
Mario Camarena González-Rubio	01-10-2018–30-09-2021	MC	
Mario Camarena González-Rubio	01-10-2021–30-09-2024	MC	He was reelected
Carlos Martínez Reyes	01-10-2024–	PAN; PRI; PRD	Coalition Fuerza y Corazón por México (Strength and Heart for Mexico)
