= Jaime Hernández =

Jaime Hernández may refer to:

- Jaime Hernández (comics) (born 1959), U.S. comic-book creator
- Jaime Hernández (cyclist) (born 1972), Spanish cyclist
- Jaime Hernández González (born 1953), Mexican politician from Jalisco
- Jaime Hernández Méndez (born 1933), Guatemalan Army officer, minister of defence in 1986–1987
