= Javier Guízar Macías =

Mexican politician (born 1964)

- Born: 15 May 1964 (age 62); Ahualulco de Mercado, Jalisco, Mexico
- Occupation: Politician
- Political party: PRI, PT

Francisco Javier Guízar Macías (born 15 May 1964) is a Mexican politician. At different times he has been affiliated with both the Institutional Revolutionary Party (PRI) and the Labour Party (PT).

Guízar Macías is a native of Ahualulco de Mercado, Jalisco. He has been elected to the Chamber of Deputies on three occasions:

- in the 1994 general election (56th Congress), for the PRI, in Jalisco's 17th district
- in the 2003 mid-terms (59th Congress), for the PRI, in Jalisco's 1st district
- in the 2024 general election (66th Congress), for the PT, in Jalisco's 1st district
