= Cuisillos =

Cuisillos can refer to:

- Cuisillos, Jalisco, a town in the municipality of Tala, Jalisco, Mexico
- Banda Cuisillos, a Mexican banda (musical group)
