= Pablo José Calvillo =

Pablo José Calvillo (1763 – April 6, 1816) served as a parish priest in northern Nueva Galicia in the early nineteenth century, and led a number of the indigenous inhabitants of the Colotlán region in open rebellion against the Spanish during the Mexican War of Independence.

== Early life ==
Calvillo was born in 1763 in the Valley of Huejúcar in northern Nueva Galicia. The village of his birth later became part of the state of Aguascalientes and was renamed Calvillo, in his honor.

He was educated at the Seminary of Guadalajara and ordained a priest by Bishop Don Juan Cruz Ruiz de Cabañas y Crespo in 1797. He served in a number of parishes in the archdiocese of Guadalajara, including Juchipila, Hacienda de San Jacinto, Ojocaliente, Tepechitlán and Colotlán, serving as pastor of the latter parish while inhabiting the town of Huejúcar.

== Military career ==
For health reasons, he temporarily resided in the city of Aguascalientes, and in 1809, while residing in Jesus María, he learned of the uprising in Dolores Hidalgo and joined in the effort. He led a group of experienced indigenous archers in Colotlán with the help of the governor of the Tlaxcala neighborhood, Marcos Escobedo.

In late September 1810, the group organized in his home in Colotlán and captured Spanish government buildings in the town and captured thirty Spaniards, who were sent to Zacatecasas prisoners.

He eventually recruited an army of 5,000 indigenous archers from Colotlán and surrounding indigenous towns and was granted the title of Field Marshal by Miguel Hidalgo. Calvillo and his troops took part in the January 17, 1811 Battle of the Bridge of Calderón, where he lost a great portion of his troops. After the most prominent leaders of the insurgency began their retreat towards the U.S. border, Calvillo went on fighting in the Zacatecas region. The priest of Santa Cruz, Jose Francisco Alvarez, head of the royalist forces, was ordered to pursue Calvillo and the two priests' forces faced each other on March 27, 1811, in the vicinity of Colotlán. Calvillo was victorious, forcing Alvarez to withdraw troops to Jerez. Soon thereafter, Brigadier Pedro Celestino Negrete launched an attack on the Calvillo's home base of Colotlán on April 7, defeating the insurgents and taking control of the town.

Calvillo and his allies organized an uprising in the town on May 11, 1811 and in August 1812 Calvillo led his troops along with those of García Ramos, Miramontes and Oropeza to take control of the cities of Hermosillo and Aguascalientes. This appears to have been the last military action of Calvillobefore he retreated into the wilderness in the Sierra de Tayahua, from where he continued to suffer ill health while attempting to obtain a pardon from civil and ecclesiastical authorities. He died in the city of Zacatecas, of natural causes and was restored to full communion with the Catholic Church on April 6, 1816.
