= Ignacio Téllez =

Mexican politician (born 1968)

- Born: 5 December 1968 (age 57); Mexicali, Baja California, Mexico
- Occupation: Politician
- Political party: PAN

Ignacio Téllez González (born 5 December 1968) is a Mexican politician from the National Action Party (PAN). From 2009 to 2012 he served in the Chamber of Deputies during the 61st Congress representing Jalisco's 1st district, and he previously served as the municipal president of Etzatlán from 2007 to 2009.
