= Lizaola =

The surname Lizaola is of Italian origin mainly found in northern Italy, spreading also to Spain what was known as Basque country.

The meaning of the name is derived from two words “Liza (tall mountain) ola (Place).

The first immigration to the West was during the latter half of the 19th century, political unrest, paired with economic uncertainty, in many countries of the Old World resulted in a Diaspora that brought many people to North America. This was opportune because governments in the United States and Canada were actively recruiting laborers to work in the mines, railways and forestry camps. Thus, as the Old World suffered from systemic political and economic turmoil and the abuse of minorities, the New World offered land, opportunity and apparent tolerance of difference. For peasants whose families for generations had tended the estates of the gentry and for workers in mines, mills and industrial enterprises, the New World was a means of taking charge of their lives and improving the lot of the next generation.

After their migration, they headed south into Mexico during the late part of the 1800s finally settling in the surrounding areas of Guadalajara, Jalisco, Mexico joining other Italian communities. The major ones established in the outskirts of Ameca, Jalisco, Mexico. Currently there are many living in the United States and Canada.
