= Cesario Padilla Navarro =

Mexican politician (born 1951)

- Born: 25 April 1951 (age 75); Jalisco, Mexico
- Occupation: Politician
- Political party: PRI

Cesario Padilla Navarro (born 25 April 1951) is a Mexican politician affiliated with the Institutional Revolutionary Party (PRI). In the 2012 general election he was elected to the Chamber of Deputies to represent Jalisco's 1st district during the 62nd session of Congress.
