= Ahualulco de Mercado =

- Municipality and city
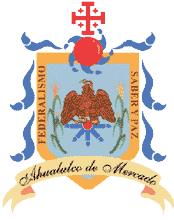
- Coat of arms

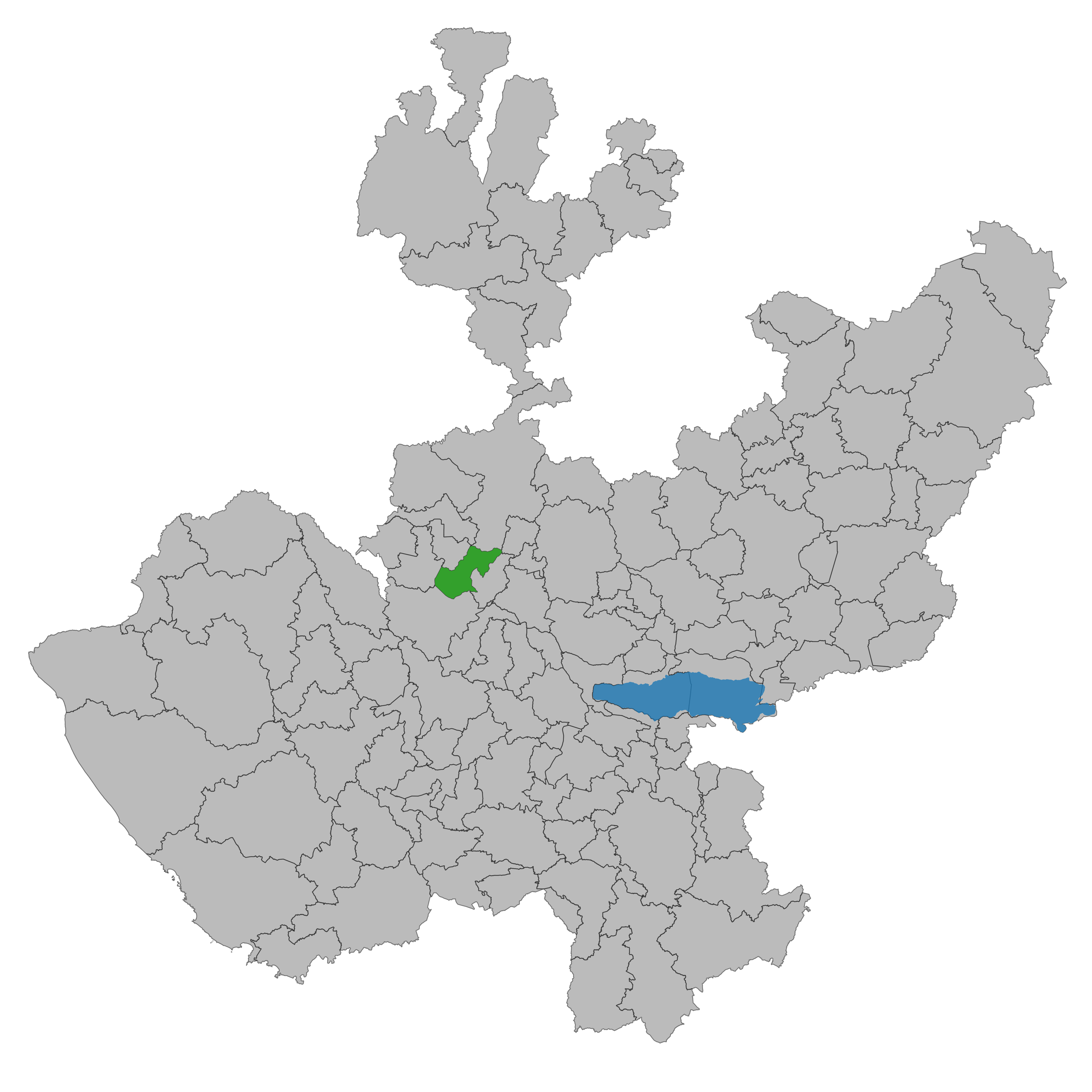
- Location of the municipality in Jalisco

- Location in Mexico
- Coordinates: 20°37′N 103°52′W
- Country: Mexico
- State: Jalisco

Area
  - Total: 274 km^{2} (106 sq mi)
  - City: 4.91 km^{2} (1.90 sq mi)

Population (2020 census)
  - Total: 23,630
  - Density: 86.2/km^{2} (223/sq mi)
  - City: 17,000
  - City density: 3,500/km^{2} (9,000/sq mi)

Ahualulco de Mercado is a city and municipality, in Jalisco in central-western Mexico. The municipality covers an area of 274 km^{2}.

As of 2005, the municipality had a total population of 21,465.

== Name origin ==
Ahualulco comes from the Nahuatl word Ayahualolco which means "place of water crowned" or "place around the water."

== Geography ==
=== Location ===
Ahualulco de Mercado is located in central Jalisco, at coordinates 20° 37'20" to 20° 46'10" north latitude and 103° 52'00" to 104º 04'30" west longitude.

The municipality is bordered on the north by the municipalities of Etzatlán, San Juanito de Escobedo and Tequila, on the east by the town of Teuchitlán, on the south by the municipalities Teuchitlán and Ameca, and on the west by the municipalities of Ameca and Etzatlán. It lies on the road from El Refugio to San Marcos and is the most populous town and tourism in this area.

=== Weather ===
The weather is semi-arid with dry winter and spring, and semi-warm, no well-defined thermal change for winter. The average annual temperature is 21.3 °C, with a high of 29.7 °C and minimum 13 °C. The rainfall occurs between the months of June and July, having a mean of 871.4 mm precipitation, and reaching up to 1,100 during the rainy season. The average annual frost days is 8. The prevailing winds are north towards the northwest.
