= Santa Rosalía, Jalisco =

Coordinates: 20°49′5″N 104°5′5″W

Santa Rosalía is a small town in Etzatlán municipality, Jalisco state, Mexico.
