= List of municipal presidents of Tequila, Jalisco =

Following is a list of municipal presidents of Tequila, in the Mexican state of Jalisco.

Municipal president	Term	Political party	Notes
Isidro Esquivel	1870–1872		
Sixto Gorjón	1872–1875		
Crescencio Salazar	1875		
J. Mercedes Aviña	1876		
Ignacio Ruiz	1877–1878		
Jesús Flores	1879		
Malaquías Cuervo	1880		
Francisco Romero	1881		
Manuel Allende	1882		
Honorato Galindo	1883		
Cenobio Sauza	1884–1885		
J. Jesús Urrea	1886–1887		
Ignacio Vallejo	1888		
José María Gutiérrez	1889		
Ignacio Vallejo	1890		
Jesús López Zuelaga	1890		
Crisanto Correa	1890		
Luis Sauza	1891–1892		
Antonio Ortiz Gordoa	1892–1894		
Luciano Gallartado	1894–1897		
Joaquín Tambón	1897		
Ignacio Romero	1898		
Miguel Jaques	1899		
Adrián Rosales	1900		
Adolfo Romero	1901		
Miguel Jaques	1902		
Malaquías Cuervo	1904–1905		
Jorge Plascencia	1907		
Marcos Rosales	1908		
Malaquías Cuervo	1908		
Juan Solares	1909		
Malaquías Cuervo	1910		
Lucio Gómez Castellanos	1911–1912		
Malaquías Cuervo	1913		
Ricardo Rodríguez	1915		
Marciano González	1916		
Ladislao Bermúdez	1917		
Cipriano Rosales	1918		
Ignacio Corona	1919		
Eliseo Corona	1920		
Francisco Orozco	1921		
J. Jesús Martínez	1922		
Malaquías Cuervo	1923–1924		
Delfino González	1925		
Florentino Cuervo	1926		
Malaquías Cuervo	1927–1928		
Florentino Cuervo	1929	PNR	
Eduardo G. González	1930–1931	PNR	
Luis R. Plascencia	1932	PNR	
Juan Cermeño	1933–1934	PNR	
Antonio Mejía	1935	PNR	
Marcos González	1936	PNR	
Enrique Acosta	1937	PNR	
Teófilo Monteón	1938	PRM	
Francisco Gaytán	1939	PRM	
Florentino Cuervo	1940–1942	PRM	
Delfino González	1943–1944	PRM	
Everardo López	1945–1946	PRM	
Eduardo Orendáin	1947–1948	PRI	
Heliodoro González	1949	PRI	
Vicente Murián Hernández	1950	PRI	Acting municipal president
Heliodoro J. González Chávez	1951	PRI	Acting municipal president
Luis Gutiérrez González	1952	PRI	
Margarito Rosales Miramontes	1953	PRI	
José Javier Díaz de Santi	1953	PRI	
Francisco Delgado Fernández	1955	PRI	
Juan García Valdez	01-01-1956–31-12-1958	PRI	
Evaristo González Vallejo	01-01-1959–31-12-1960	PRI	
Martiniano Hidalgo Jaramillo	1961	PRI	Acting municipal president
Juan García Valdez	01-01-1962–31-12-1964	PRI	
Martiniano Hidalgo Jaramillo	01-01-1965–31-12-1967	PRI	
Miguel Hernández Torres	01-01-1968–31-12-1970	PRI	
Martiniano Hidalgo Jaramillo	01-01-1971–31-12-1973	PRI	
Miguel Andalón Álvarez	01-01-1974–31-12-1976	PRI	
Leonel Partida del Toro	01-01-1977–31-12-1979	PRI	
Miguel Hernández Torres	01-01-1980–31-12-1982	PRI	
J. Trinidad Cervantes Nájar	01-01-1983–1985	PRI	
J. Luis Hernández Beas	1985	PRI	Acting municipal president
Armando González Castañeda	01-01-1986–31-12-1988	PRI	
Jesús Padilla Landeros	01-01-1989–1992	PRI	
Eduardo Orendáin Giovannini	1992–1995	PRI	
J. Félix García Rivera	1995–1997	PAN	
Gustavo Macías Zambrano	01-01-1998–31-12-2000	PAN	
José Guadalupe Núñez Rodríguez	01-01-2001–31-12-2003	PAN	
José Miguel Marín Sánchez	01-01-2004–31-12-2006	PRI	
Guillermo Cordero García	01-01-2007–31-12-2009	PAN	
Germán García Rivera	01-01-2010–30-09-2012	PAN	
Gilberto Arellano Sánchez	01-10-2012–2015	PAN	Applied for a leave
Macario Miramontes Rivera	2015–30-09-2015	PAN	Acting municipal president
Felipe de Jesús Jiménez Bernal	01-10-2015–30-09-2018	PRI; PVEM	
José Alfonso Magallanes Rubio	01-10-2018–04-03-2021	PAN; PRD; MC	Applied for a leave to run for reelection
Beatris Miramontes Rivera	05-03-2021–2021	PAN; PRD; MC	Acting municipal president
José Alfonso Magallanes Rubio	01-10-2021–30-09-2024	PAN	Was reelected on 06-06-2021
Diego Rivera Navarro	01-10-2024–05-02-2026	Morena; PT; PVEM	Coalition "Sigamos Haciendo Historia" (Let's Keep Making History). He was destituted after being arrested
Lorena Marisol Rodríguez Rivera	08-02-2026–	Morena; PT; PVEM	Coalition "Sigamos Haciendo Historia" (Let's Keep Making History). Acting municipal president
