= Jaime Hernández González =

Mexican politician (born 1953)

- Born: 18 September 1953 (age 72); Guadalajara, Jalisco, Mexico
- Education: University of Guadalajara
- Occupation: Politician
- Political party: PRI

Jaime Hernández González (Note: In this Mexican name, the surname is Hernández and the second or maternal family name is González.) (born 18 September 1953) is a Mexican politician from the Institutional Revolutionary Party (PRI).

Hernández González is a native of Guadalajara, Jalisco, and holds a law degree from the University of Guadalajara.

From 1998 to 2000, served as a local deputy in the 55th session of the Congress of Jalisco and, in the 2000 general election, he was elected to the Chamber of Deputies to represent Jalisco's 1st district during the 58th session of Congress.
