= Gustavo Macías Zambrano =

Mexican politician, former municipal president of Tequil

Deputy of the LXV Legislature of the Mexican Congress
- Incumbent
- Assumed office 1 September 2021
- Preceded by: Eduardo Ron Ramos

Deputy of the LX Legislature of the Mexican Congress
- In office 1 September 2006 – 31 August 2009
- Preceded by: Francisco Javier Guízar Macías
- Succeeded by: Ignacio Téllez González

Municipal president of Tequila, Jalisco
- In office 1 January 1998 – 31 December 2000
- Preceded by: J. Félix García Rivera
- Succeeded by: José Guadalupe Núñez Rodríguez

Personal details
- Born: 26 August 1969 (age 56) Tequila, Jalisco, Mexico
- Party: PAN
- Education: University of Guadalajara; Universidad del Valle de México
- Occupation: Politician

Gustavo Macías Zambrano (born 26 August 1969) is a Mexican politician affiliated with the National Action Party who serves as a federal deputy in the LXV Legislature of the Mexican Congress.

He previously served as a federal deputy of the LX Legislature of the Mexican Congress representing Jalisco. He then served as a local deputy in the LIX Legislature of the Congress of Jalisco, though he was removed from the office by the Supreme Court of Justice of the Nation in 2012. He later served as a local deputy in the LXII Legislature.
