= Marcos Escobedo =

Mexican rebel

- Born: 1784; Colotlán, Jalisco, Viceroyalty of New Spain
- Died: 1833 (aged 48–49); Colotlán, Jalisco, Mexico
- Military career
- Allegiance: Miguel Hidalgo
- Rank: Second Lieutenant
- Conflicts: Mexican War of Independence
- Other work: Mayor of Colotlán

Marcos Marcelo Escobedo (1784–1833) was a military commander in the Mexican War of Independence. He later became Mayor of Colotlán, Jalisco.

== Early life ==
Marcos Escobedo was born in 1784, son of José Joaquín Escobedo, presumably, a descendant of the original Tlaxcaltec colonizers of the region.

== Military career ==
In 1808, he held the title Second Lieutenant in the Spanish army and was governor of the Tlaxcala neighborhood. On November 1, 1808, he declared himself in favor of Mexico's independence from Spain, and along with a priest named Pablo José Calvillo and the indigenous garrisons of the region, put himself at the service of independence leader Miguel Hidalgo.

In January 1811, he and his troops participated in the Battle of the Bridge of Calderón. His troops suffered great losses in the battle and returned to Colotlán to face the troops of Francisco del Real, Juan Lozano, and Sebastián Gallegos, who had occupied the town's square in their absence. In the same month, they faced a battle in Las Canoas with the troops of royalist priest Álvarez known as "El Chicharronero". In April 1811, his troops faced the army of Colonel Pedro Celestino Negrete and were defeated in the Battle of Tierra Blanca. Marcos Escobedo went into hiding for several years after this defeat.

In 1817, he came out of hiding and once again joined the war for independence, fighting battles in the towns of San Andrés, Chalchihuites and Huejuquilla, gaining control of the region for the independence movement. He then joined forces with the armies of Tlaltenango and Jerez and launched a military campaign to take Bolaños and then Tepic.

== Late life ==
On September 27, 1820, Marcos Escobedo organized great festivities in Colotlán to celebrate Mexican independence and the entrance of the independence movement's troops into Mexico City. In 1825, Marcos Escobedo was named Mayor of Colotlán. As mayor, he was charged with subjugating the indigenous groups in the region who opposed the distribution of communal lands. Marcos Escobedo died on August 7, 1833.

== Bibliography ==
- Bernardo Carlos Casas. Historia de Colotlán.
- José María Muria. Sumario histórico de Jalisco.
