= Magdalena, Jalisco =

Magdalena
- Municipality and town
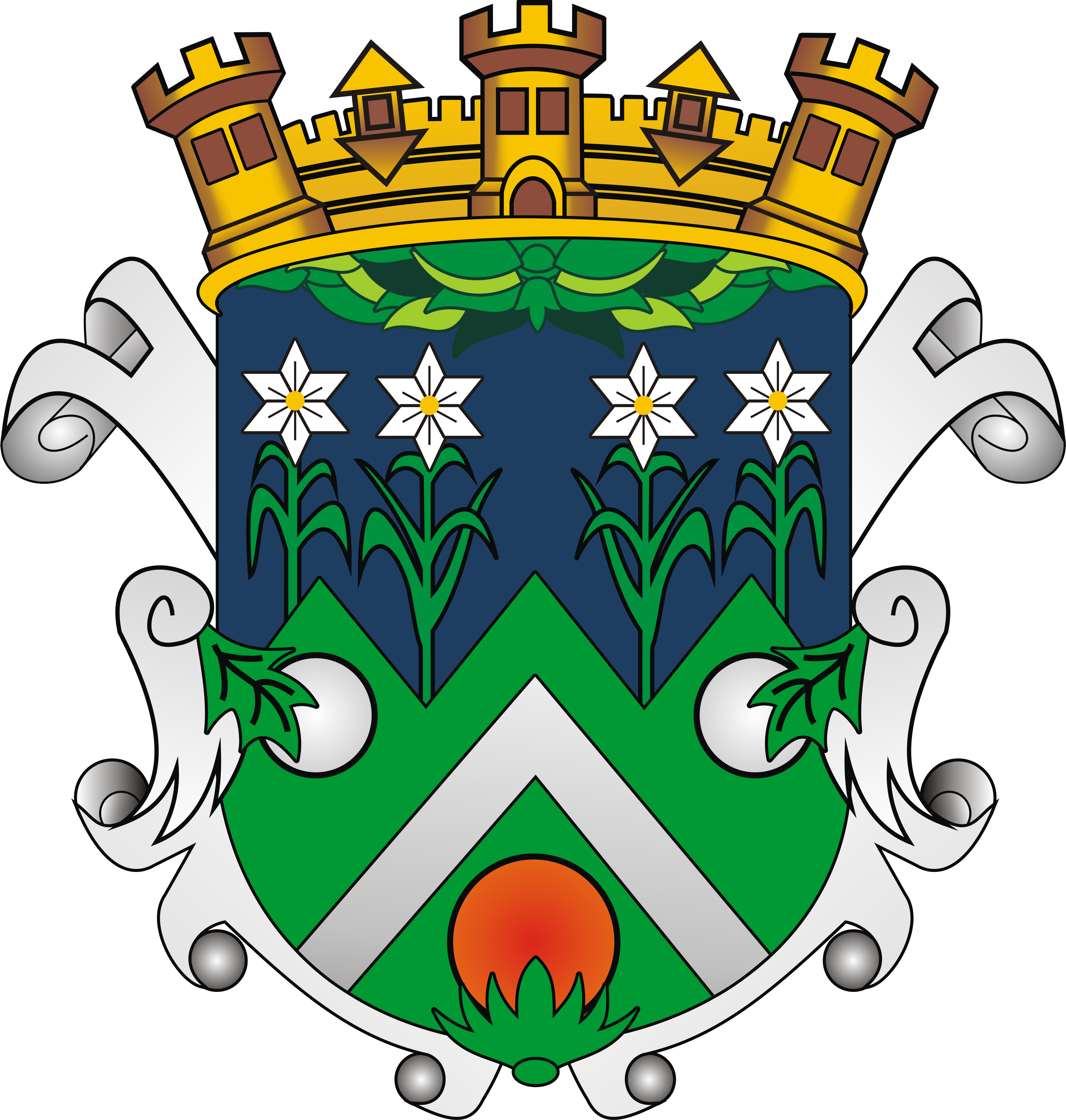
- Coat of arms

- Location of the municipality in Jalisco

- Location in Mexico
- Coordinates: 20°55′N 103°57′W
- Country: Mexico
- State: Jalisco

Area
  - Total: 293.2 km^{2} (113.2 sq mi)
  - Town: 4.35 km^{2} (1.68 sq mi)

Population (2020 census)
  - Total: 21,781
  - Density: 74.29/km^{2} (192.4/sq mi)
  - Town: 16,873
  - Town density: 3,880/km^{2} (10,000/sq mi)
- Time zone: UTC-6 (Central Standard Time)

Magdalena is a town and municipality in the state of Jalisco in central-western Mexico. Magdalena lies 78 kilometers northwest of Guadalajara. The municipality covers an area of 293.2 km^{2}. It borders the state of Nayarit to the west, and the town of Tequila to the east. As of 2005, the municipality had a total population of 18,924.

== Geography ==
The town is situated on rather high 1350 meters above sea level. It borders mountains to the north and somehow smaller hills to the south.

In the west, there is a big water reservoir called the Laguna de Magdalena, which features many different birds.

=== Climate ===
Climate data for Magdalena, Jalisco (1991–2020 normals, extremes 1955–present)
Month	Jan	Feb	Mar	Apr	May	Jun	Jul	Aug	Sep	Oct	Nov	Dec	Year
Record high °C (°F)	38 (100)	37 (99)	39 (102)	40.2 (104.4)	41 (106)	45 (113)	38 (100)	39 (102)	39.5 (103.1)	38 (100)	37.5 (99.5)	36.5 (97.7)	45 (113)
Mean daily maximum °C (°F)	26.0 (78.8)	28.0 (82.4)	30.4 (86.7)	32.6 (90.7)	34.0 (93.2)	33.0 (91.4)	30.1 (86.2)	29.5 (85.1)	29.1 (84.4)	28.9 (84.0)	27.8 (82.0)	26.4 (79.5)	29.6 (85.3)
Daily mean °C (°F)	16.3 (61.3)	18.0 (64.4)	19.7 (67.5)	21.8 (71.2)	23.6 (74.5)	24.8 (76.6)	23.4 (74.1)	23.1 (73.6)	22.9 (73.2)	21.7 (71.1)	19.0 (66.2)	16.7 (62.1)	20.9 (69.6)
Mean daily minimum °C (°F)	6.6 (43.9)	7.9 (46.2)	9.0 (48.2)	10.9 (51.6)	13.3 (55.9)	16.6 (61.9)	16.7 (62.1)	16.8 (62.2)	16.6 (61.9)	14.5 (58.1)	10.3 (50.5)	7.1 (44.8)	12.2 (54.0)
Record low °C (°F)	0 (32)	0.5 (32.9)	0 (32)	0 (32)	5 (41)	8 (46)	10 (50)	10.5 (50.9)	7 (45)	3 (37)	1 (34)	−1 (30)	−1 (30)
Average precipitation mm (inches)	27.4 (1.08)	12.6 (0.50)	7.8 (0.31)	2.6 (0.10)	19.6 (0.77)	159.9 (6.30)	253.1 (9.96)	248.4 (9.78)	173.3 (6.82)	54.7 (2.15)	13.6 (0.54)	14.6 (0.57)	987.6 (38.88)
Average precipitation days	2.2	1.4	0.7	0.6	2.0	11.1	17.7	17.2	13.1	4.9	1.6	1.7	74.2
Source: Servicio Meteorológico Nacional

== Gems ==
Magdalena is famous for fire opals; the whole region accommodates hundreds of mines where obsidian, fire opals, and other rocks are produced. In the town, there are several stores selling stones.
