= Huejúcar =

- Municipality and town
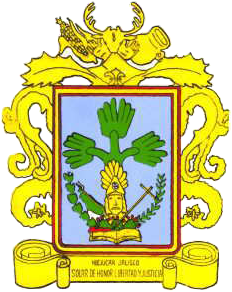
- Coat of arms

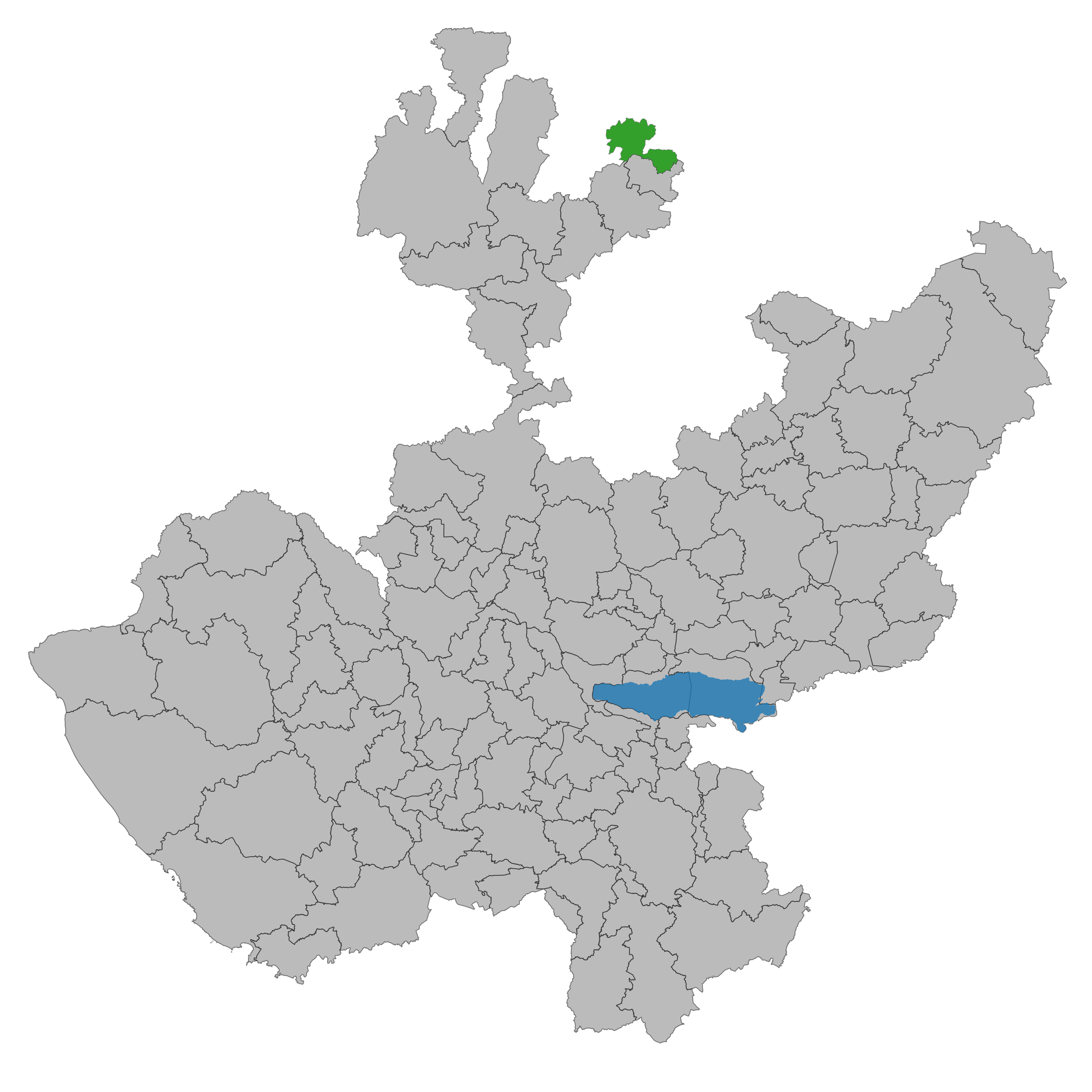
- Location of the municipality in Jalisco

- Location in Mexico
- Coordinates: 22°21′32.6484″N 103°12′38.8296″W
- Country: Mexico
- State: Jalisco
- Municipality: Huejúcar

Government
  - Type: Ayuntamiento
  - Municipal president: Arcelia Díaz Márquez; MC

Area
  - Total: 309.2 km^{2} (119.4 sq mi)
  - Town: 3.21 km^{2} (1.24 sq mi)
- Elevation: 1,750–2,600 m (5,740–8,530 ft)

Population (2020 census)
  - Total: 5,920
  - Density: 19.1/km^{2} (49.6/sq mi)
  - Town: 3,762
  - Town density: 1,170/km^{2} (3,040/sq mi)
- Time zone: UTC-6 (Central)
- Postal code: 46260
- Website: http://www.huejucar.jalisco.gob.mx/index.html

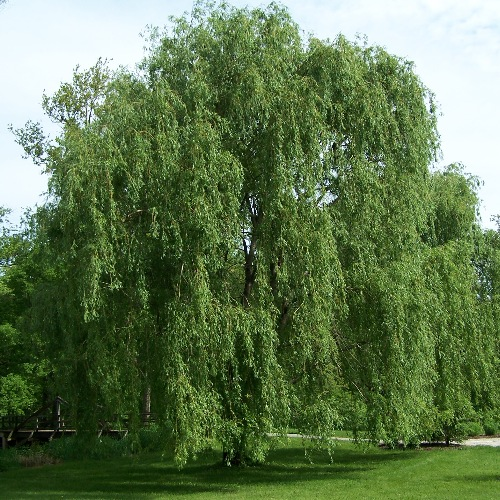
An example of a Willow

Huejúcar is a town and municipality, in Jalisco in central-western Mexico. The municipality covers an area of 309.2 km^{2}.

As of 2020, the municipality had a total population of 5,920.

The name Huejúcar means "Place of Willows" in Nahuatl. It is about 240 km from the state capital, Guadalajara. It is next to Santa María de los Ángeles and Tepetongo. The municipality borders with the state of Zacatecas.

== History ==
The city of Huejucar can trace its history back beyond the creation of Nueva Galicia in the Viceroyalty of New Spain. In 1530, Pedro Almíndez Chirinos passed through and conquered the area in the name of Spain during his voyage from Cuitzeo, Michoacan to Tepic, Nayarit. On March 13, 1837, a decree is made that Huejucar would become part of the Colotlan Municipality. Later, on November 9, 1861, Huejucar would become its own municipality and twelve years later on September 24, 1873, would receive the title of Villa.

== Geography ==
The town has average elevation of about 2,000 meters (6,600 feet) and the municipality's elevation varies drastically to as low as 1,750 meters (5,740 feet) in the valleys and as high as 2,600 meters (8,500 feet) in its mountainous areas on the western end of the municipality along the Sierra Madre Occidental Mountains. Hydrothermal streams and ponds dot the landscape to the west while the east and northeastern areas lead into the vast Mexican Plateau region in between the Sierra Madre Occidental and Oriental regions.

Mexican Federal Highway 23 runs north–south which connects Huejucar on the southern terminus to the metropolitan area of Guadalajara, Jalisco and on its northern terminus to Fresnillo, Zacatecas.

=== Flora and fauna ===
Its vegetation is scarce in most of the territory. There are mainly drought-resistant plants such as: Vachellia farnesiana, Mesquite, Pitaya, Opuntia ficus-indica, Agave and some species of Populus, Pine and other trees in a small proportion.

=== Climate ===
The town of Huejucar, although its average elevation is higher than that of the alpine city of Denver, Colorado in the United States, it is in a semiarid region with monsoonal weather in the summer months (July and August, mostly) with an average rainfall of 530.30 mm (20.878 in) of rainfall per year and an average temperature of 17.4C (63.3F). Summer months can reach highs on average of 38.3C (100.9F) while winter months reach lows on average of 0.8C (33.4F). Due to the Sierra Madre Occidental Mountains to the west, winds usually gust from the northeast.

Climate data for Huejúcar (1991–2020 normals, extremes 1947–present)
Month	Jan	Feb	Mar	Apr	May	Jun	Jul	Aug	Sep	Oct	Nov	Dec	Year
Record high °C (°F)	33 (91)	33 (91)	45 (113)	38 (100)	38 (100)	37.5 (99.5)	35 (95)	34 (93)	35 (95)	33.5 (92.3)	43 (109)	30.5 (86.9)	45 (113)
Mean daily maximum °C (°F)	22.7 (72.9)	24.6 (76.3)	26.9 (80.4)	29.4 (84.9)	31.3 (88.3)	30.1 (86.2)	27.8 (82.0)	27.6 (81.7)	26.8 (80.2)	26.5 (79.7)	25.0 (77.0)	23.1 (73.6)	26.8 (80.2)
Daily mean °C (°F)	12.4 (54.3)	14.1 (57.4)	16.0 (60.8)	18.3 (64.9)	21.1 (70.0)	22.0 (71.6)	20.6 (69.1)	20.4 (68.7)	19.7 (67.5)	17.8 (64.0)	15.0 (59.0)	12.8 (55.0)	17.5 (63.5)
Mean daily minimum °C (°F)	2.1 (35.8)	3.6 (38.5)	5.1 (41.2)	7.3 (45.1)	11.0 (51.8)	13.9 (57.0)	13.5 (56.3)	13.2 (55.8)	12.6 (54.7)	9.1 (48.4)	5.0 (41.0)	2.6 (36.7)	8.2 (46.8)
Record low °C (°F)	−10 (14)	−7 (19)	−6 (21)	−2 (28)	−5 (23)	5 (41)	2 (36)	1 (34)	1 (34)	−2 (28)	−7.5 (18.5)	−7 (19)	−10 (14)
Average precipitation mm (inches)	22.8 (0.90)	13.9 (0.55)	5.8 (0.23)	1.9 (0.07)	14.2 (0.56)	102.2 (4.02)	155.4 (6.12)	118.3 (4.66)	113.4 (4.46)	32.7 (1.29)	13.2 (0.52)	11.9 (0.47)	605.7 (23.85)
Average precipitation days	2.4	1.8	0.9	0.7	2.9	11.6	16.5	15.2	13.0	5.1	2.5	2.1	74.7
Source: Servicio Meteorológico Nacional

== Annual Festivities ==
Huejucar’s yearly fair, which normally lasts 7-10 days, begins in late September and runs until early October. This festival has been a tradition for decades. Entire families travel from neighboring towns like Colotlán, Jerez Zacatecas, and Santa María de los Ángeles to enjoy Huejucar and its traditional festival. The goal of this celebration is to honor San Francisco De Assis the municipality's patron saint, who is respected deeply by those who live in Huejucar, Jalisco.

The festival offers a range of food stands, restaurants and activities for people of all ages. Three female contestants participate for the title of "queen of the fair" one month before the event. The queen represents the festivities and locals in Huejucar have the opportunity to vote for their desired candidate. Live music is one of the most visible forms of entertainment featured at the fair. Performers and bands that have performed at the festival include Chuy Lizarraga, Aldo Trujillo, La Arrolladora Banda El Limón, and Ramon Ayala. During the live performances people dance to the rhythm of the music. The festival also includes carnival games and rides for younger people. The Lienzo charro arena hosts Jaripeos (rodeos), and charros enthusiasts come to watch the traditional equestrian sport of Charrería.

== Government ==
=== Municipal presidents ===
Term	Municipal president	Political party	Notes
01/01/1983-31/12/1985	Francisco Campos Casas	PRI	
01/01/1986-31/12/1988	Juan Madera López	PRI	
1989-1992	Jorge Santacruz Flores	PRI	
1992-1995	J. Everardo Chávez Sotelo	PRI	
1995-1997	Francisco Santos Salas	PRI	
01/01/1998-31/12/2000	Miguel Ángel Martínez Bañuelos	PAN	
01/01/2001-31/12/2003	Bonifacio Rodrigo Silva de la Torre	PAN	
01/01/2004-31/12/2006	Miguel Ángel Martínez Bañuelos	PAN	
01/01/2007-31/12/2009	Édgar Humberto Villarreal Macías	PRI	
01/01/2010-30/09/2012	Bonifacio Rodrigo Silva de la Torre	PAN	
01/10/2012-30/09/2015	Francisco Santacruz Acuña	PRI	
01/10/2015-30/09/2018	Álvaro García Salazar	PRI	
01/10/2018-28/02/2021	Arcelia Díaz Márquez	MC	
01/03/2021-30/09/2021	Aaaa Bbbb Cccc	MC	Acting municipal president
01/10/2021-	Arcelia Díaz Márquez	MC	She was reelected on 06/06/2021, to start a second triennium
