= Ameca, Jalisco =

Ameca
- Municipality and City
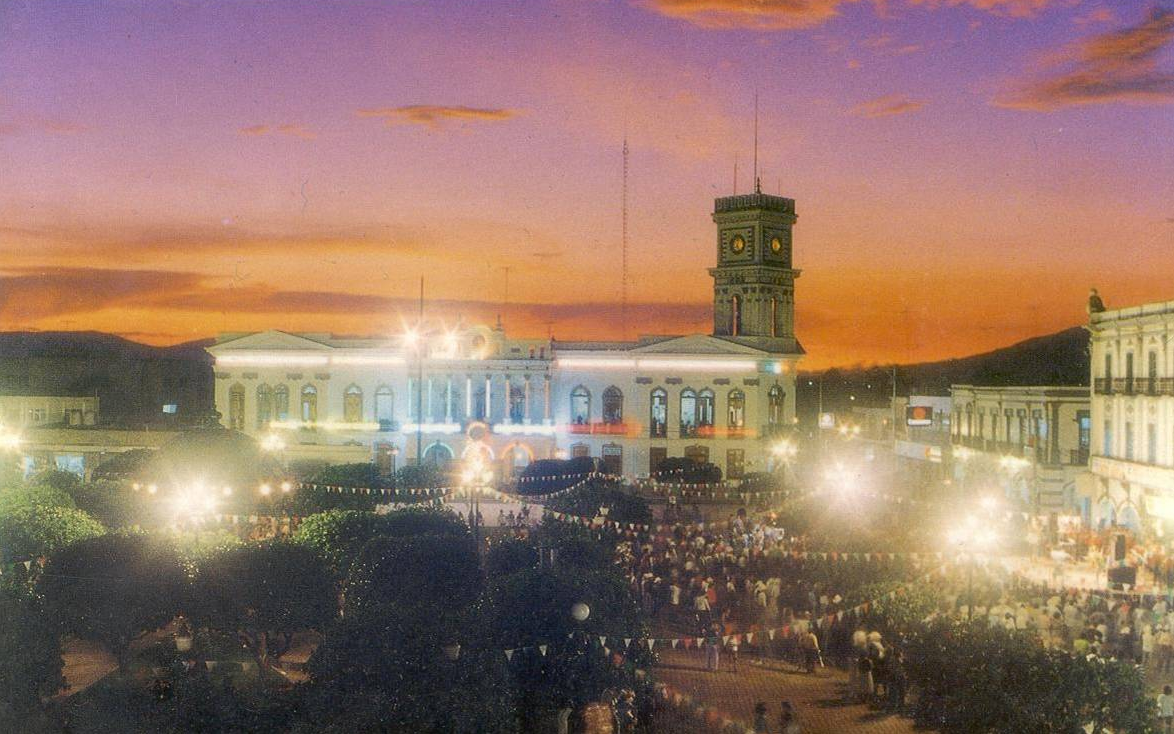
- View of the main plaza of Ameca.

- Coat of arms

- Location of the municipality in Jalisco
- Coordinates: 20°33′N 104°2′W
- Country: Mexico
- State: Jalisco
- Settled: 1325
- Established: 1522
- Incorporated: April 22, 1833

Government
  - Type: Municipality and City
  - Municipal President: Valente Serrano

Area
  - Total: 839.1 km^{2} (324.0 sq mi)
  - City: 10.17 km^{2} (3.93 sq mi)

Population (2020 census)
  - Total: 60,386
  - Density: 71.97/km^{2} (186.4/sq mi)
  - City: 37,871
  - City density: 3,724/km^{2} (9,645/sq mi)
- Demonym: Amequense

Ameca (Nahuatl languages: Amecatl "string of water") is a city and municipality, in Jalisco in central-western Mexico. The municipality covers an area of 839.1 km^{2}. The city is bisected by the Ameca River which drains to the Pacific Ocean near Puerto Vallarta. It is located approximately 83 km (approximately 50 miles) from the state capital and one of Mexico's largest commercial centers, Guadalajara.

The city is also the seat and largest city of the federal sub-division Región Valles, which compromises the municipalities situated on the central valleys of Jalisco.

As of 2010, the municipality had a total population of 57,340, and the city a population of 36,156, making it the 15th largest city of Jalisco in terms of population.

== History ==
In the early 16th century Ameca was the center of the small kingdom of Ameca. This state was conquered by the Spanish in 1524. It was part of the alcaldia mayor of Autlan, New Spain during the Spanish colonial period.

The first of the conquerors who arrived in Ameca was the Spanish soldier Juan de Anesta in 1522, who arrived barefoot, alone and with his sword in hand. The natives received him alone because they thought he was the son of the sun, as their ancestors had predicted who would come to conquer and that all would be subject to him and pay tribute.

Juan de Anesta had reached Anesta Olid Colima; lived in Ameca 4 or 5 years, after which it was returned to Colima encomendero of Ameca.

In 1529, Fray Antonio de Cuellar with other friars and Spanish built an adobe chapel, the royal house, the square, jail, an inn and a few houses in what is now the city center.

In 1541, the Spanish started catechizing the natives by Fray Antonio de Cuellar, who died on August 12 of that year when he left Ameca, right in the great revolt against the Spanish that was unleashed by that time. He was attacked in the mountains of Etzatlán and killed by arrow wounds. In 1549, the town of Ameca was elevated to the status of city hall and fell within the territory of New Spain.

The political division of the region had many changes; Ameca depended first of Colima, after Mexico, Sayula and Cocula.

In 1824, it was incorporated into the department's Cocula Turned capital town title in September 1830.

On April 22, 1833, by decree of the State Congress, Ameca was declared a city.

In 1979, Ameca held its founding 450 years and on April 28, the three branches of government moved to establish a formal sitting.

== Geography ==
Ameca is located in the central-western state of Jalisco, approximately 83 km (approximately 50 miles) from the state capital and one of Mexico's largest commercial centers, Guadalajara. It is located between the coordinates 20 ° 25'00 and 20 º 42'00 north latitude and between 103 º and 104 º 53'15 17'30 west longitude, located at a height of 1,635 meters above sea level . It has an area of 685.73 square km and its population in 2000 was 56.681 people. According to the 2005 population census INEGI, the township population was 54.161 inhabitants.

To the North are the municipalities of San Marcos, and Ahualulco Etzatlán Market, on the south and Tecolotlán Atengo, on the east and San Martín Hidalgo Teuchitlán and west Guachinango and Nayarit.

Its rolling hills or Cuauhtépetl Ameca, mainly occupying the northern part of town, and it has an irregular topography characterized by a succession of valleys and vast mountains in different areas of the municipality.

Water resources, the Ameca River forms the northern reserves by the remnants of streams, Llanitos, La Barranca, La Arena, El Carrizo, and balls, among others, on the south streams feed into The Master, Arroyo Grande, El Zoquite, The Palmarejo, the Alamo and Las Canoas and countless small streams. In addition, there are the dams of San Ignacio de la Vega, Los Pocitos and the Texcalame.

=== Climate ===
In Ameca, the January temperature averages 16 °C (60 °F). In June, the average is 23 °C (74 °F). Rainfall is heaviest between June and September. Average annual rainfall is 134 centimeters (53 inches). Puerto Vallarta, to its right on the Pacific Ocean is warmer, with average January temperatures of 22 °C (71 °F) and June average temperatures 28 °C (82 °F). The Köppen Climate Classification subtype for this climate is "Cfa" (Humid Subtropical Climate).

Climate data for Ameca, Mexico (1951-2010)
Month	Jan	Feb	Mar	Apr	May	Jun	Jul	Aug	Sep	Oct	Nov	Dec	Year
Record high °C (°F)	35.0 (95.0)	38.0 (100.4)	39.0 (102.2)	41.0 (105.8)	39.0 (102.2)	38.5 (101.3)	37.0 (98.6)	36.5 (97.7)	36.0 (96.8)	35.0 (95.0)	32.0 (89.6)	33.0 (91.4)	41.0 (105.8)
Mean daily maximum °C (°F)	24.7 (76.5)	26.5 (79.7)	29.0 (84.2)	31.2 (88.2)	32.5 (90.5)	30.5 (86.9)	27.5 (81.5)	27.3 (81.1)	27.1 (80.8)	27.1 (80.8)	26.4 (79.5)	24.7 (76.5)	27.9 (82.2)
Daily mean °C (°F)	17.1 (62.8)	18.4 (65.1)	20.7 (69.3)	22.8 (73.0)	24.5 (76.1)	23.9 (75.0)	22.0 (71.6)	21.9 (71.4)	21.8 (71.2)	21.0 (69.8)	19.2 (66.6)	17.5 (63.5)	20.9 (69.6)
Mean daily minimum °C (°F)	9.5 (49.1)	10.3 (50.5)	12.3 (54.1)	14.3 (57.7)	16.4 (61.5)	17.3 (63.1)	16.5 (61.7)	16.4 (61.5)	16.5 (61.7)	14.9 (58.8)	12.1 (53.8)	10.3 (50.5)	13.9 (57.0)
Record low °C (°F)	−1.5 (29.3)	0.0 (32.0)	1.0 (33.8)	0.0 (32.0)	1.0 (33.8)	10.0 (50.0)	9.0 (48.2)	11.0 (51.8)	10.0 (50.0)	8.0 (46.4)	3.0 (37.4)	−1.0 (30.2)	−1.5 (29.3)
Average rainfall mm (inches)	15.6 (0.61)	6.6 (0.26)	4.7 (0.19)	6.2 (0.24)	24.9 (0.98)	191.2 (7.53)	272.5 (10.73)	226.1 (8.90)	169.5 (6.67)	61.4 (2.42)	13.7 (0.54)	10.0 (0.39)	1,002.4 (39.46)
Average rainy days (≥ 0.1 mm)	2.1	1.2	0.7	1.1	3.5	15.2	21.6	20.0	15.5	6.4	1.8	1.8	90.9
Average relative humidity (%)	54	48	45	40	43	61	72	73	73	67	60	60	58
Mean monthly sunshine hours	219.6	239.3	264.9	264.3	291.1	221.5	198.5	210.7	191.1	223.5	232.3	187.0	2,743.8
Source 1: Servicio Meteorologico Nacional
Source 2: Colegio de Postgraduados (humidity and sun)

== Economy ==
A large population of Ameca residents are engaged in commercial activities, agriculture and livestock. Several stand-out city industries include the production and engineering of sugar from a great number of resident sugar-cane plantations, the Coca-Cola Company distributor branch, and the feed industry. There is also great production in the businesses of bricks, tortillas, carpentry, bakeries, and saddlery. Ameca also has a large number of shops of various kinds, which are an important part of the economy.

Ameca is home to various well-known service organizations such as the Red Cross, the Rotary Club, Lions Club, nursing and several other charities. In terms of health services, there are numerous nursing homes, hospitals, IMSS clinics, among others. Great educational services are provided by many schools, public and private schools, at all levels of education. Among the most renowned institutions, the following are found in the city: Federal High Schools No. 1 and No. 50, the Homeland School, CETIS 63 (Technical School), the CECATI 180, Regional High School CUValles Ameca and University Center of the Valleys, the latter two from the University of Guadalajara.

Tequila plantations make up part of Ameca's economy, mostly for private farmers.

The Hayward, California based restaurant chain La Piñata produces a line of tequilas at their distillery in the Ameca region.

== Tourism ==
Ameca is abundant in cultural attractions, one main attraction being the town hall built in 1529, and neoclassical buildings of the former hospital Hilarion Gil Romero currently serving as Regional Cultural Center. Other attractions include the House of Culture and the Temple of Santo Domingo. Other places of interest include the Ex hacienda of Cabezon and San Antonio Matute, built in 1911.

Natural attractions include the Ameca River and many streams like the Palmarejo and pillars. Seen as natural spas, the hills of Ameca and hills are suitable for exploration. The stone rocks in the Sierra de Ameca, appear as old fields with gigantic bowling balls. These peculiar rocks can measure a few centimeters in diameter to 3 meters.

The City Hall dates from 1529 but was burned in 1914 and rebuilt between 1917 and 1924. With its neoclassic facade, it is composed of two stories and to the right side is made up of the famous quadrangular tower clock that has on each side, framed in quarry, battlements. The House of Culture includes exhibitions of art and historical objects, as well as music and dance events, among others. Also held in August of every year, is the Cultural, a sample of the fine arts, which has been reaching popularity over the years. It has within it the Ameca Regional Museum, which despite being very small, it is important for the quality of its archaeological and paleontological collections consist of more than 10,000 pieces. The rescue of this material was made by Professor Philemon Gutiérrez Ramírez who, for 50 years of his life, collected pieces from the region (Ameca valley, Quitupan, Tala) and other entities of the country (Nayarit, Veracruz and Zacatecas). In 1982, he donated his collection to found a museum with the support of the City.

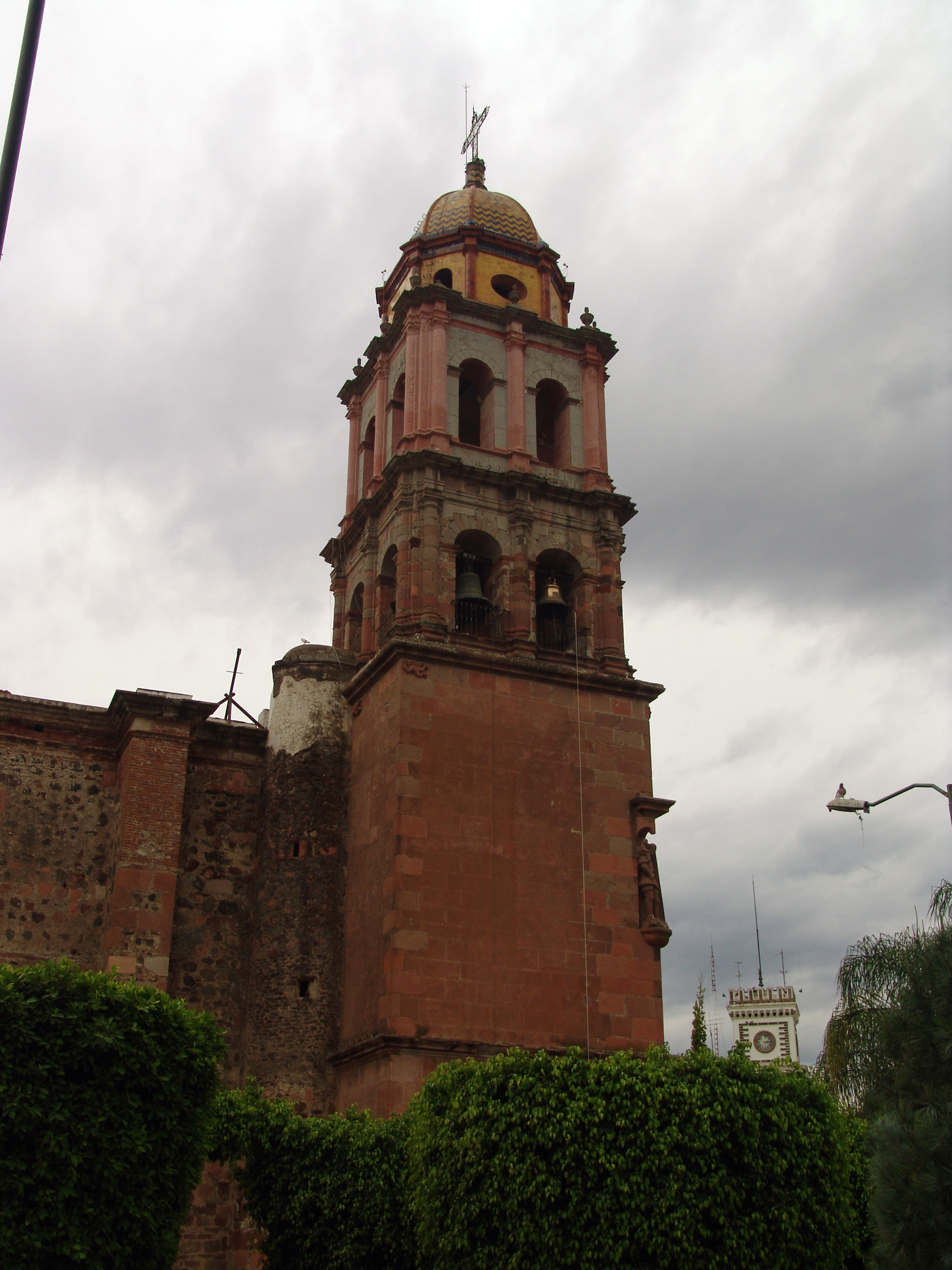
Parroquia de Santiago Apostol.

St. James parish (Parroquia de Santiago) built in the sixteenth century, has had modifications since the 1930s. Its pink stone facade has a tower composed of three bodies; there are cross atrial figures of the Passion of the Christ and of the inscription made in 1687. In the inside of the temple, the main altarpiece is styled in the neoclassic manner. The recently remodeled atrium looks better than ever with its new and spacious gardens that are home to different types of roses and flowers. Parroquia de Santiago is located in the main square and is one of the most beautiful buildings in the city.

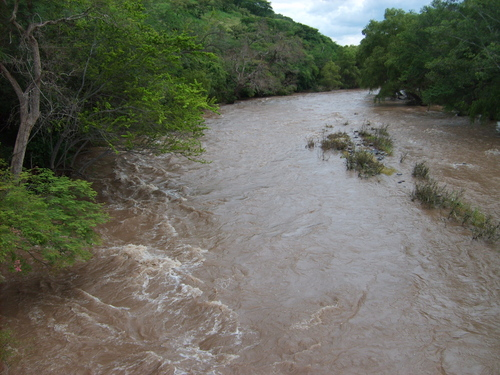
Ameca River.

The Temple of our Lady of Guadalupe, or Santuario de la Virgen de Guadalupe, dates back to 1875.

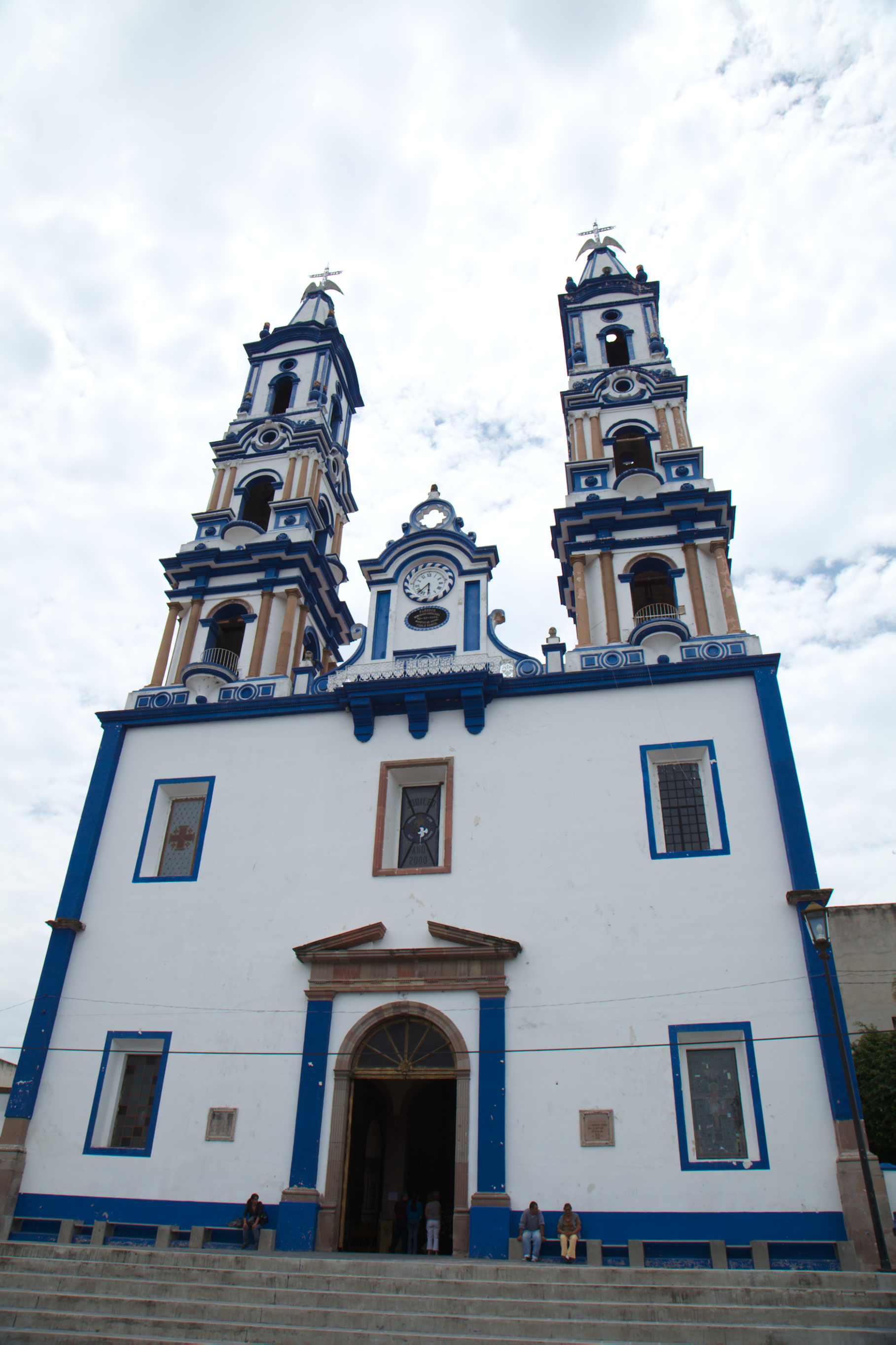
Temple of our Lady of Guadalupe Virgin de Guadalupe.

Señor Grande de Ameca, a beautiful sculpture of the crucified Christ made with cornstalk paste by indigenous hands centuries ago, is nearly two meters tall from his feet to his head. With the body and face full of bloody wounds and the open side, is in the niche of the main altar of the church of St. James of Ameca, Jalisco. The largest festival of Lord Ameca is movable, it takes place between the months of April and May, with nine days.

Capilla de la Conchinta, a nineteenth-century parish is also a frequented tourist attraction.

Haciendas are among the most important estates in the area including El Cabezon, San Antonio Matute, La Esperanza, El Portezuelo, The Cuis, Santa Maria de la Huerta, Jayamitla, La Higuera, San Miguel, San Nicolas, La Villita, La Labor de Solis, the work of San Ignacio, La Vega, La Gavilana and San Juan de los Arcos. Some of them in ruins, others partially destroyed and some restored.

Piedras Bola In the Sierra de Ameca, in the area corresponding to Ahualulco de Mercado Township, where in 1867 an American archaeologist discovered more than 20 stone spheres. Piedras Bolas vary in size: on average, between one and two meters in diameter, although some are close to three meters. The age is estimated at around 40 million years ago, during the Tertiary period, by capricious crystallization of volcanic ash, which some attribute to the Tequila Volcano, distant only 30 km.

Other tourist attractions include orchards and natural baths that have formed in the various streams within and around outskirts of the municipality.

== Notable people ==
- Guillermo Cañedo de la Bárcena (1920–1997), soccer manager and businessman
- Flavio Romero de Velasco (1925–2016), politician, Governor of Jalisco 1977–1983

== Leaders of Ameca ==
=== Rulers of the Chiefdom of Amecatl ===
Leader	Year
Jojouhquitecuani	1325-?
Timinzique	1522-?

=== Rulers of the Alcaldía Mayor de Ameca ===
Leader	Year
Juan de Añesta	1522-1532
Juan de Inhesta	1549
Martín Cortés	1579
Antonio de Leyva	1579

=== Municipal Presidents ===
Name	Year
Abraham Aguilar Romero	1983-1985
Miguel Medina Ramos	1986-1988
Manuel Castro Aranda	1989-1992
Roberto Rubio Zárate	1992-1995
Ramón Ahumada Meza	1995-1997
Marco Antonio Pérez Hernández	1998-2000
Jesús Guerrero Hernández	2001-2003
Rubén Armando Salazar Prado	2004-2006
Gilberto Arevalo Ahumada	2006-2009
Salvador Sigala Quintero	2010-2012
