= Tala, Jalisco =

Tala
- Municipality and town
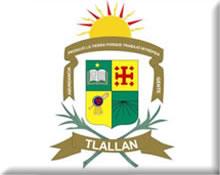
- Coat of arms

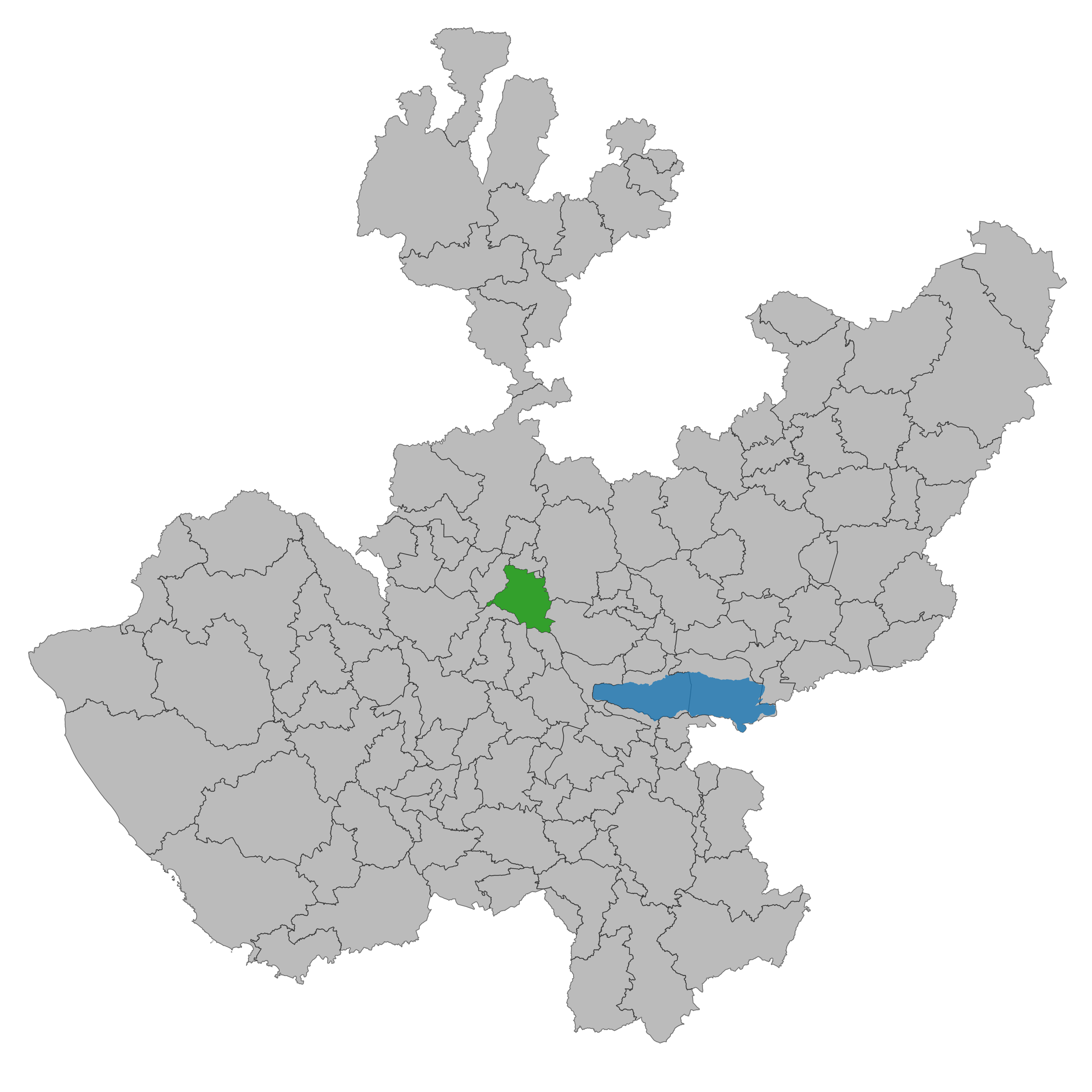
- Location of the municipality in Jalisco

- Location in Mexico
- Coordinates: 20°40′N 103°42′W
- Country: Mexico
- State: Jalisco

Area
  - Municipality: 389.24 km^{2} (150.29 sq mi)
  - Town: 7.51 km^{2} (2.90 sq mi)
- Elevation: 1,820 m (5,970 ft)

Population (2020 census)
  - Municipality: 87,690
  - Density: 225.3/km^{2} (583.5/sq mi)
  - Town: 40,906
  - Town density: 5,450/km^{2} (14,100/sq mi)
- Area code: 384
- Climate: Cwa
- Website: https://www.talajalisco.gob.mx/

Tala is a town and a municipality in the state of Jalisco, Mexico. It is a small town that has grown over the years. Some major towns in the municipality are Tala (municipal seat), El Refugio, San Isidro Mazatepec, Cuisillos, and Ahuisculco.

== History ==
"Tlallan", "Tala" or "Land of labor". It was a manor ruled by Pythaloc who had under his jurisdiction Ahuitzculco, Ocotán, Nextipac and Xocotán. It is believed that its foundation dates back to 1126. Nuño Beltrán de Guzmán conquered it in 1530 and was evangelized in 1531 by Fray Antonio de Segovia, Fray Juan de Badillo and Fray Andrés de Córdova. The peninsular found the ruins of Cués or shrines scattered in the Tala Valley. The aborigines did not submit easily to the conquerors and had two battles with them. Tala was compromised in the jurisdiction of the Kingdom of Nueva Galicia as a corregimiento. Its first ruler was Francisco Socorro Nuño de Guzmán who was the most combative aborigine, and Pedro Patiño de Guzmán was left in his place. In 1579 it was entrusted to Diego de Colio. Its inhabitants had a forest that they loved very much, being forced to cut it down when the Spaniards arrived. Out of sarcasm or contemptuously they began calling the town Talatitlán, degenerating into its current name. Throughout the colonial era, Tala retained its category of corregimiento. Since 1825 it belonged to the first Canton of Guadalajara and the department or party of Zapopan; and on that date Tala already had a town hall. On April 3, 1844 the town hall is established. Since 1847 it belonged to the 1st Canton of Guadalajara and the Department or Zapopan Party. In 1887 it has category of town. In 1995 Tala is elevated to the category of city. By 1890 the town of Tala included in its jurisdiction the following towns and farms: El Refugio, Cuisillos, Huaxtla, San Isidro, Ahuisculco, Santa Ana Tepetitlán and Navajas. In 1920 they are annexed to the municipality Cuxpala and San Isidro. By decree number 10211, published on January 10, 1980, it was decided that the population of Tala would rise to the category of city, having achieved higher rates of progress in the political, economic, cultural, social, demographic aspects; for its infrastructure works and in merit to the greatness and dignity of its inhabitants that are characterized by their civic, moral and intellectual qualities.

== Tourism ==
=== Historical Monuments ===
Temple of San Francisco de Asís, Chapel of the Rosary, Treasury of the Orendaín Refuge.

=== Archeological zones ===
In the Tala Valley there are scattered archeological vestiges of what in the pre-Hispanic era were shrines or cués. In the region they are known as Guachimonton.

=== Parties ===
The Caña Fair that takes place on the last days of April and the first of May. The Feasts of San Francisco de Asís that are celebrated from September 26 to October 4.

=== Music ===
Mariachi & Banda

=== Handicrafts ===
Handicrafts are made with obsidian and saddlery.

=== Traditional costumes ===
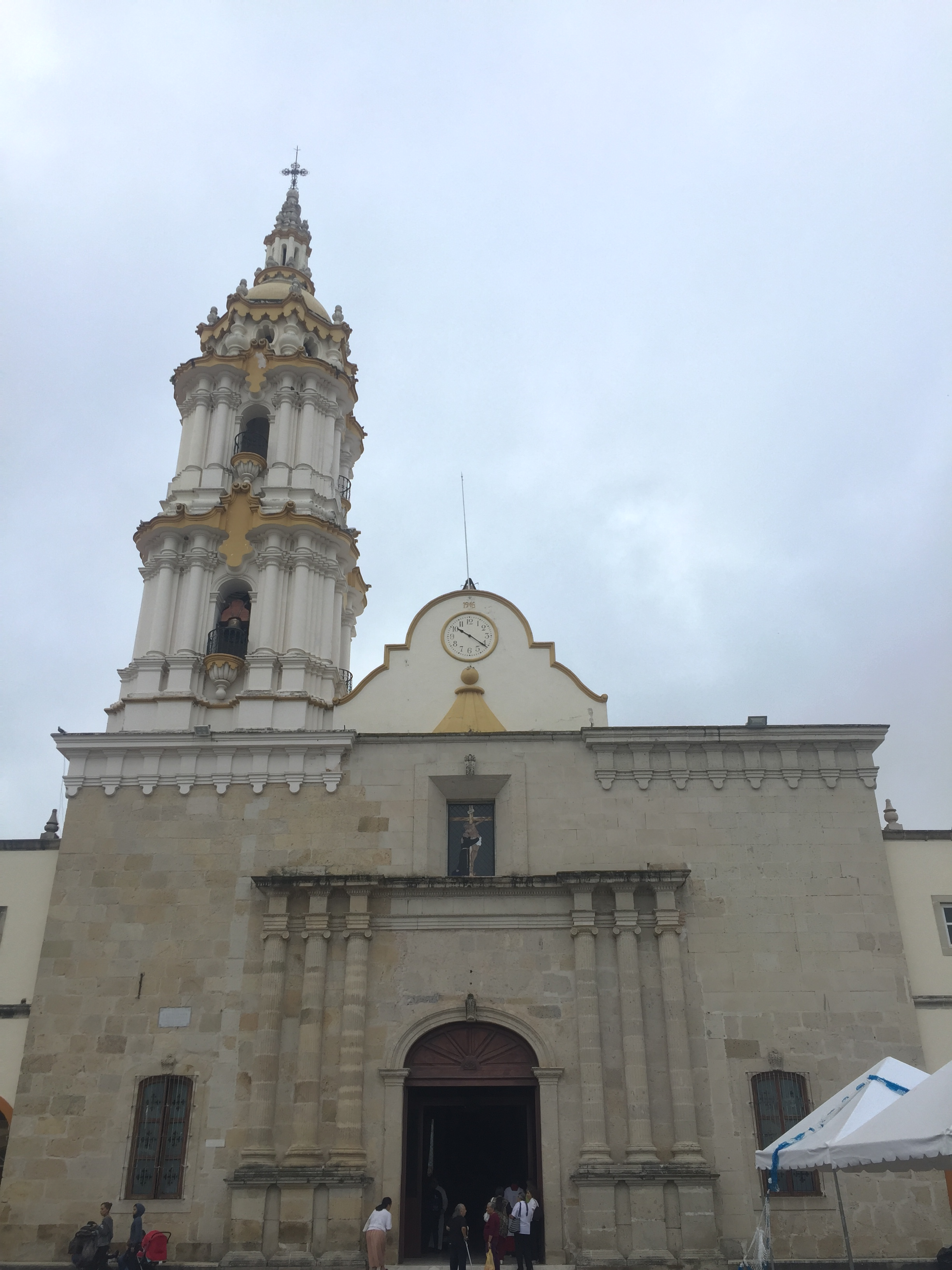
Main Church of Tala

The charro suit and the dress of poblana china.

=== Gastronomy ===
Well and birria; piloncillo, dulce de leche and fruits in syrup; cane juice, punch and coffee with liquor, cane mezcal.

=== Touristic centres ===
The municipality has natural forests located in "La Primavera" Ahuisculco, Cerro de Las Garzas, Cerro Monte Negro, Las Navajas Hill and spas such as Los Tejabanes and El Rincón.

== Government ==
=== Municipal presidents ===
Municipal president	Term	Political party	Notes
Manuel I. Gómez	1918-1919		
Pedro Romo Vivar	1921		
Manuel I. Gómez	1921-1922		
Dionisio M. Gómez	1923		
Luis García Rodríguez	1924		
Benito Navarro Castillo	1925		
Luis García Rodríguez	1926		
Juan Calderón Martínez	1927-1928		
Benito Navarro Castillo	1928		
Luis García Rodríguez	1929	PNR	
Antonio López	1929	PNR	
Francisco M. Gómez	1929	PNR	
Benito Navarro Castillo	1930	PNR	
Dionisio R. Mariscal	1931	PNR	
Dionisio M. Gómez	1932-1933	PNR	
J. Jesús Núñez Guzmán	1934	PNR	
Mateo Romero López	1935	PNR	
Pedro C. Castro	1936	PNR	
Pedro Ramírez Calderón	1937	PNR	
Blas Sepúlveda	1938	PNR	
Francisco Rodríguez Z.	1938	PRM	
Eleno Vega Mariscal	1939	PRM	
Mateo Romero López	1940	PRM	
Marcial Sayavedra	1941-1942	PRM	
Pedro Ramírez Calderón	1943	PRM	
Juan Zavala Rosales	1944	PRM	
Eleno Vega Mariscal	1945-1946	PRM	
Francisco López Suárez	1947-1949	PRI	
J. Jesús Cortés Martínez	1950-1952	PRI	
Francisco Checa Zavala	1953-1955	PRI	
Espiridión López García	1956-1958	PRI	
Adolfo Diéguez Palomera	1959-1961	PRI	
Ramiro González Gómez	1962-1964	PRI	
Carlos González Sánchez	1965-1967	PRI	
J. Jesús Zavala Calderón	1968-1970	PRI	
Carlos Rodríguez Rodríguez	1971-1973	PRI	
Luis Arias Gómez	1974-1976	PRI	
Antonio Murillo Rosales	1977-1979	PRI	
Luis Arias Gómez	1980-1982	PRI	
Javier Barragán Castro	1983-1985	PRI	
J. Jesús Hernández Lira	1986-1988	PRI	
J. Jesús Cortés Gómez	1989-1992	PARM	
J. Rosario Zavala Quezada	1992-1995	PRI	
Teresa Núñez Casas	1995-1997	PRI	
Narciso Valdez Partida	1997	PRI	Acting municipal president
José de Jesús Morales Delgadillo	1998-2000	PRD	
Narciso Valdez Partida	2001-2003	PRI	
María Elena Núñez Casas	2004-2006	PRI	
Cipriano Aguayo Durán	2007-2009	PRD PT	
Salvador Jorge Rivera Guerrero	2010-2012	PRD	
Antonio López Orozco	2012-2015	PRI PVEM	
Arturo Macías	2015	PRI	Acting municipal president
Aarón César Buenrostro Contreras	2015-2018	PRI PVEM	
Enrique Gabriel Buenrostro Ahued	2018-2021	PAN PRD MC	
José Luis López Cervantes	2021	PAN PRD MC	Acting municipal president
Antonio Porfirio Casillas Díaz	2021-	PRI	
