= San Juanito de Escobedo =

Coordinates: 20°48′N 104°00′W

- Municipality
- Location in Jalisco San Juanito de Escobedo (Mexico)
- Country: Mexico
- State: Jalisco
- Demonym: (in Spanish)
- Time zone: UTC−6 (CST)

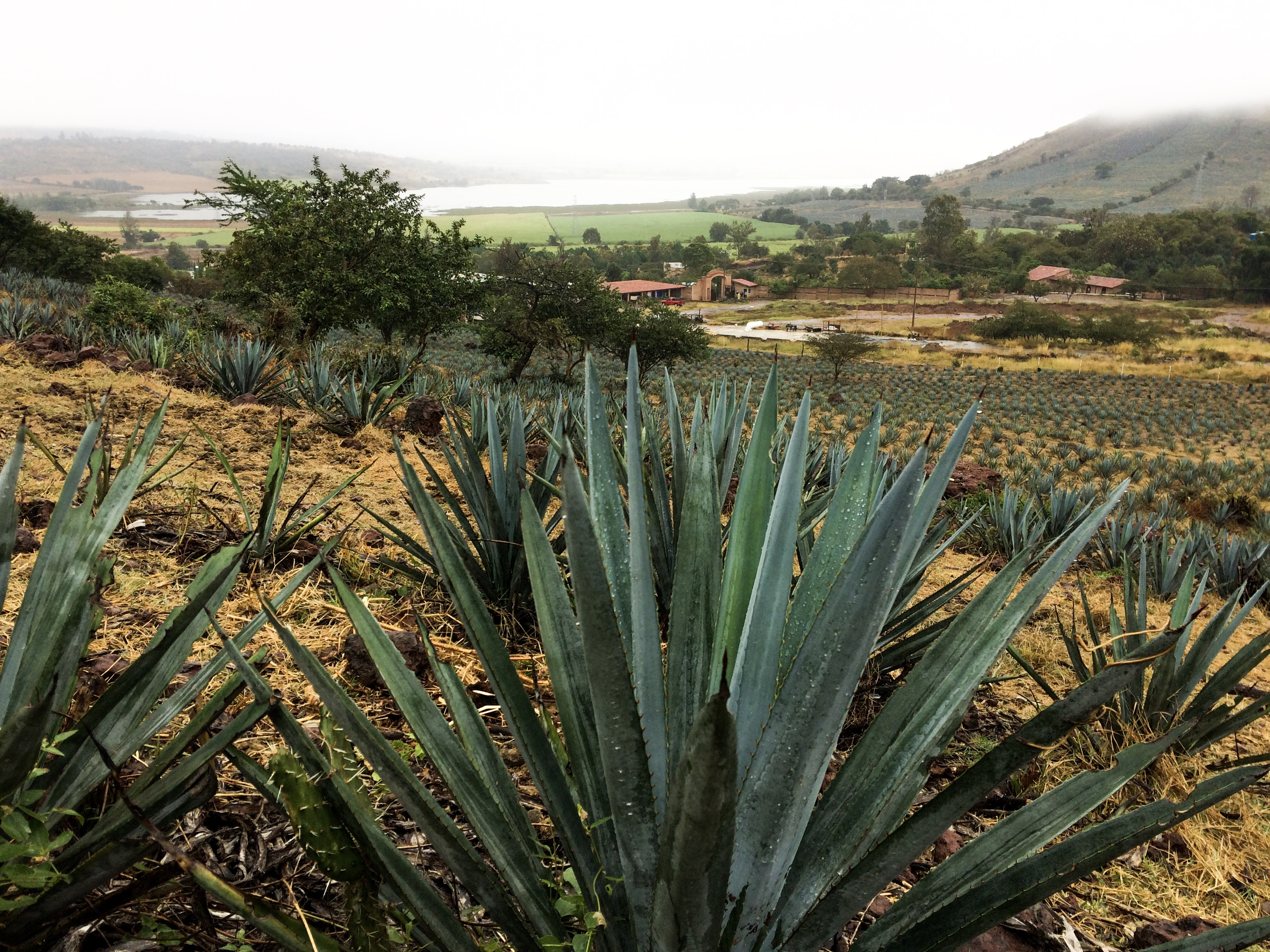
Agave landscape in Jalisco.

San Juanito de Escobedo is a municipality in Jalisco, Mexico. The municipal capital is San Juanito de Escobedo , a town founded in 1512.
