= Etzatlán =

- Municipality and town
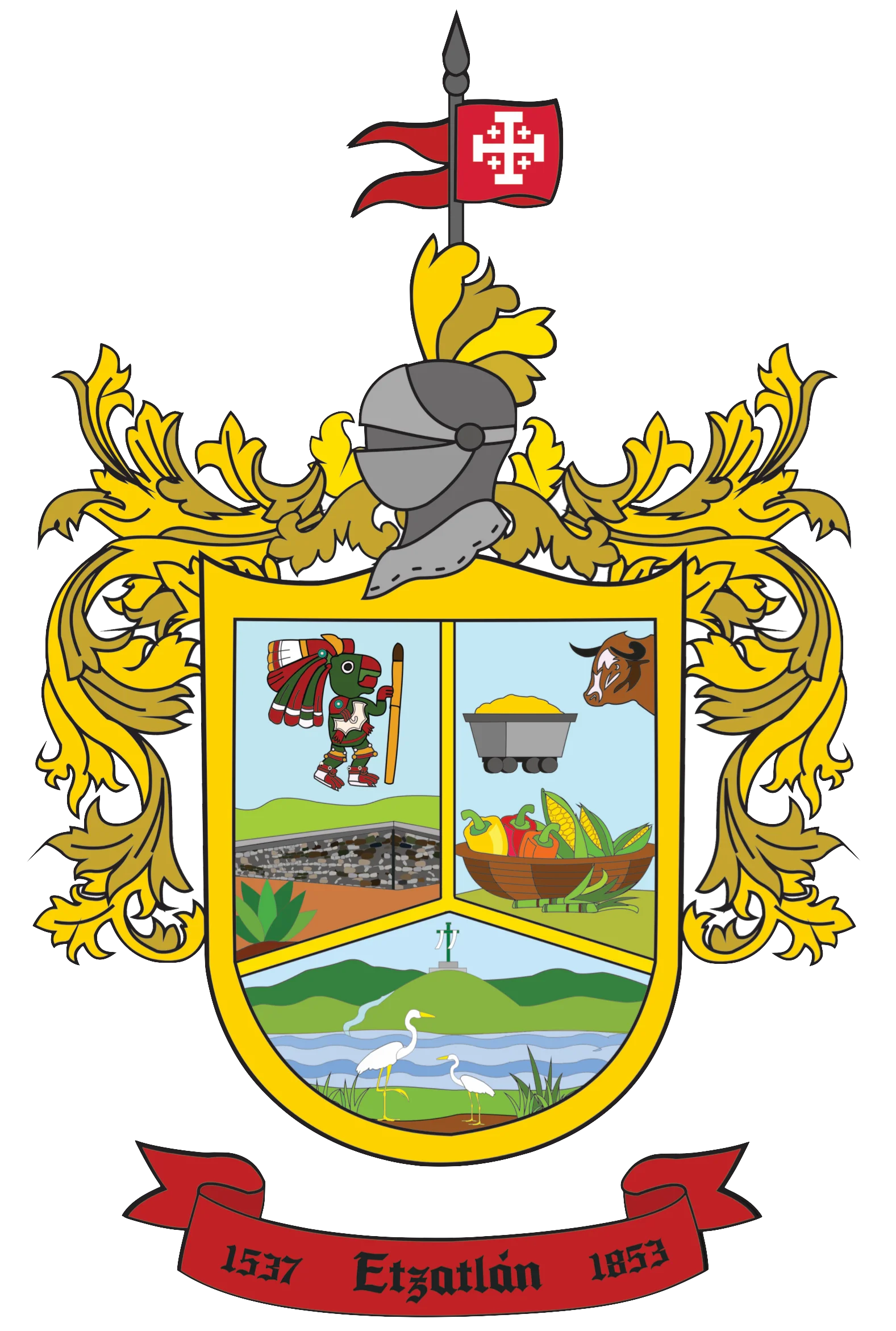
- Coat of arms

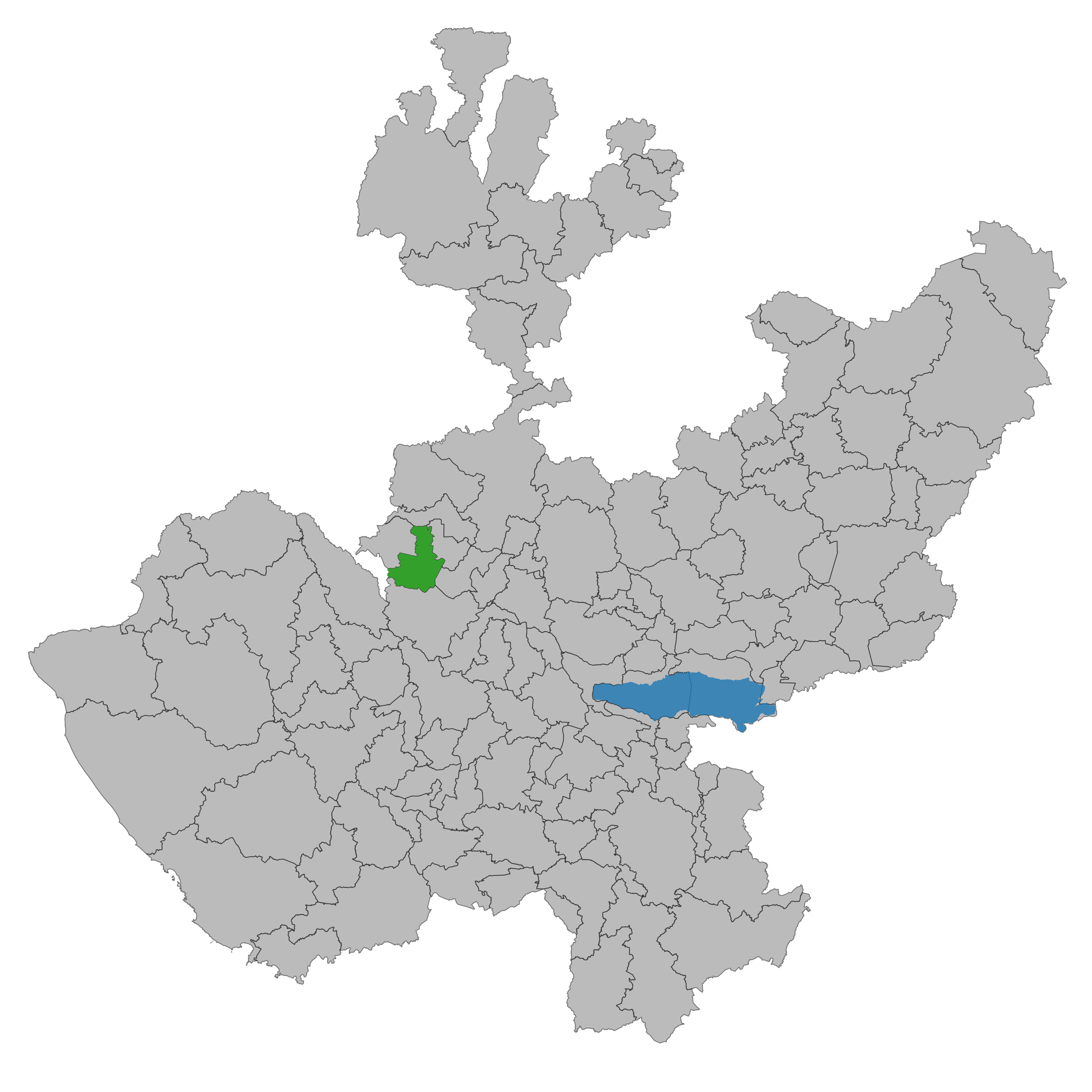
- Location of the municipality in Jalisco

- Location in Mexico
- Coordinates: 20°46′N 104°05′W
- Country: Mexico
- State: Jalisco

Area
  - Total: 337.8 km^{2} (130.4 sq mi)
  - Town: 3.68 km^{2} (1.42 sq mi)

Population (2020 census)
  - Total: 20,011
  - Density: 59.24/km^{2} (153.4/sq mi)
  - Town: 14,697
  - Town density: 3,990/km^{2} (10,300/sq mi)

Etzatlán is a town and municipality, in Jalisco in central-western Mexico. The municipality covers an area of 337.8 km^{2}.

As of 2005, the municipality had a total population of 17,564.

It is home to the world’s largest crochet canopy, as certified by The Guinness Book of World Records.

In 2020, the Chilean writer José Baroja dedicated a story entitled Etzatlán to this.

== Localities ==
Name	Population (2005)
Etzatlán	12,924
Oconahua	2,132
Santa Rosalía	1,079
La Mazata	589
San Rafael (Hacienda de San Rafael)	168
Puerta de Pericos (Tlachichilco)	141
Palo Verde	132
San Sebastián (Ex-hacienda de San Sebastián)	98
El Amparo (La Embocada)	64
La Quebrada	63

== Notable people ==
- Luis Felipe Lomelí (1975-), writer
- Carlos Quintero Arce (1920-2016), was a Mexican prelate and at his death he was the oldest Mexican bishop
