= List of towns in Zacatecas =

List of towns in Mexican state of Zacatecas

This is a list of towns in Zacatecas in Mexico.

== A ==
- Alameda Juárez (Santa Rosa)
- Apizolaya
- Apozol
- Atolinga

== B ==
- Benito Juárez
- Buenavista

== C ==
- Cañitas de Felipe Pescador
- Casa de Cerros
- Chalchihuites
- Chichimequilla
- Ciudad Garcia
- Coapas
- Concepción del Oro

== E ==
- El Carnero
- El Fuerte
- El Plateado de Joaquín Amaro
- El Teul de Gonzalez Ortega
- El Visitador
- Estancia de Animas (La Estancia)
- El Tepetate

== F ==
- Fresnillo
- Florencia de Benito Juárez
- El Ruso

== G ==
- Guadalupe

== H ==
- Huanusco
- Huitzila

== J ==
- Jalpa
- Jerez
- Juan Aldama
- Juchipila
- Jarillas

== L ==
- La Cofradia Jalpa
- La Estrella
- La Quemada
- Lazaro Cardenas
- Loreto
- Los Indios
- Luis Moya
- Laguna Grande
- Lobatos
- Los Aparicio, Zacatecas
- Los Griegos, Zacatecas

== M ==
- Mezquital del Oro
- Miguel Auza
- Milpillas de Allende
- Milpillas de la Sierra
- Momax
- Moyahua de Estrada
- Monte Escobedo

== N ==
- Nieves
- Nochistlan
- Norias
- Maria de la torre

== O ==
- Ojitos de Santa Lucia
- Ojocaliente

== P ==
- General Panfilo Natera a.k.a. La Blanca
- Paunco
- Pinos
- Plateros

== R ==
- Rio Grande
- Rio Florido (Fresnillo)

== S ==
- Sain Alto
- San José de Lourdes
- San Juan de Mesquital
- San Martin
- Santiaguillo
- Santo Santiago
- Sombrerete
- Susticacán

== T ==
- Tabasco
- Tacoaleche
- Tepechitlán
- Tepetongo
- Tlachichila
- Tlaltenango de Sánchez Román
- Tayahua
- Tenanguillo
- Trinidad Garcia De La Cadena

== V ==
- Valparaíso
- Veinte de Noviembre
- Villanueva
- Villa González Ortega
- Villa de Cos

== Z ==
- Zapoqui
- Zacatecas
