= 3rd federal electoral district of Zacatecas =

Federal electoral district of Mexico

Zacatecas's 3rd
- Electoral district of the Chamber of Deputies of Mexico

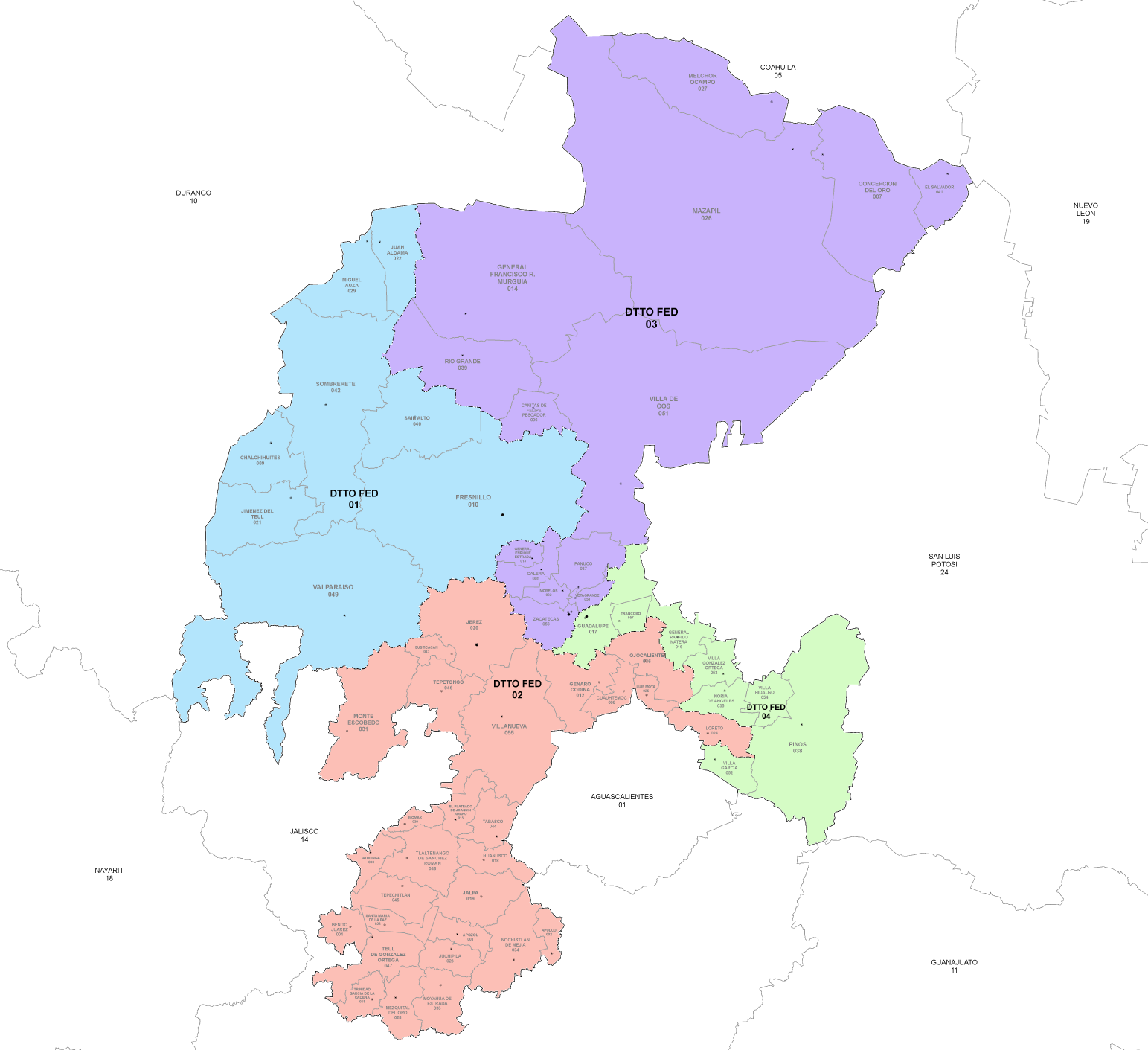
- 3rd district since 2023

Incumbent
- Member: Ulises Mejía Haro
- Party: ▌Morena
- Congress: 66th (2024–2027)

District
- State: Zacatecas
- Head town: City of Zacatecas
- Coordinates: 22°46′N 102°34′W
- Covers: 14 municipalities: Calera, Cañitas de Felipe Pescador, Concepción del Oro, General Enrique Estrada, General Francisco R. Murguía, Mazapil, Melchor Ocampo, Morelos, Pánuco, Río Grande, El Salvador, Vetagrande, Villa de Cos, Zacatecas
- PR region: Second
- Precincts: 430
- Population: 405,879 (2020 census)

The 3rd federal electoral district of Zacatecas (Spanish: Distrito electoral federal 03 de Zacatecas) is one of the 300 electoral districts into which Mexico is divided for elections to the federal Chamber of Deputies and one of four such districts in the state of Zacatecas.

It elects one deputy to the lower house of Congress for each three-year legislative session by means of the first-past-the-post system. Votes cast in the district also count towards the calculation of proportional representation ("plurinominal") deputies elected from the second region.

The current member for the district, elected in the 2024 general election, is Ulises Mejía Haro of the National Regeneration Movement (Morena).

== District territory ==
Evolution of electoral district numbers
	1974	1978	1996	2005	2017	2023
Zacatecas	4	5	5	4	4	4
Chamber of Deputies	196	300				

Under the 2023 districting plan adopted by the National Electoral Institute (INE), which is to be used for the 2024, 2027 and 2030 federal elections, the 3rd district of Zacatecas covers 430 electoral precincts (secciones electorales) across 14 municipalities in the north of the state:

- Calera, Cañitas de Felipe Pescador, Concepción del Oro, General Enrique Estrada, General Francisco R. Murguía, Mazapil, Melchor Ocampo, Morelos, Pánuco, Río Grande, El Salvador, Vetagrande, Villa de Cos and Zacatecas.

The head town (cabecera distrital), where results from individual polling stations are gathered together and tallied, is the state capital, the city of Zacatecas. The district reported a population of 405,879 in the 2020 census.

== Deputies returned to Congress ==
(Mexico) National parties
- Current
- PAN
- PRI
- PT
- PVEM
- MC
- Morena
- PAZ
- Somos
- Defunct or local only
- PLM
- PNR
- PRM
- PNM
- PP
- PPS
- PARM
- PFCRN
- CON
- PANAL
- PSD
- PES
- PES
- PRD

Zacatecas's 3rd district
Election	Deputy	Party	Term	Legislature
1976	Filiberto Soto Solís	Institutional Revolutionary Party	1976–1979	49th Congress
1976	José Leal Longoria	Institutional Revolutionary Party	1976–1979	50th Congress
1979	Rafael Cervantes Acuña	Institutional Revolutionary Party	1979–1982	51st Congress
1982	Roberto Castillo Aguilar (Note: Castillo Aguilar died in office on 8 January 1983.); Eulogio Quirarta Flores	Institutional Revolutionary Party	1982–1985	52nd Congress
1985	Eliseo Rangel Gaspar	Institutional Revolutionary Party	1985–1988	53rd Congress
1988	Victorio de la Torre	Institutional Revolutionary Party	1988–1991	54th Congress
1991	Pedro de León Sánchez; Antonio Sandoval Luna	Institutional Revolutionary Party	1991–1992; 1992–1994	55th Congress
1994	Gustavo Salinas Íñiguez	Institutional Revolutionary Party	1994–1997	56th Congress
1997	Ricardo Monreal Ávila; María Martha Veyna Soriano	Institutional Revolutionary Party	1997–1998; 1998–2000	57th Congress
2000	Magdalena Núñez Monreal	Party of the Democratic Revolution	2000–2003	58th Congress
2003	Amalia García; Rafael Candelas Salinas	Party of the Democratic Revolution	2003–2004; 2004–2006	59th Congress
2006	Raymundo Cárdenas	Party of the Democratic Revolution	2006–2009	60th Congress
2009	Heladio Verver y Vargas Ramírez	Party of the Democratic Revolution	2009–2012	61st Congress
2012	Judit Guerrero López	Institutional Revolutionary Party	2012–2015	62nd Congress
2015	Claudia Anaya Mota; Elizabeth Hernández Calderón	Institutional Revolutionary Party	2015–2018; 2018	63rd Congress
2018	Alfredo Femat Bañuelos	Labour Party (Mexico)	2018–2021	64th Congress
2021	Alfredo Femat Bañuelos	Labour Party (Mexico)	2021–2024	65th Congress
2024	Ulises Mejía Haro	National Regeneration Movement	2024–2027	66th Congress

== Presidential elections ==
Zacatecas's 3rd district
Election	District won by	Party or coalition	%
2018	Andrés Manuel López Obrador	Juntos Haremos Historia	50.6253
2024	Claudia Sheinbaum Pardo	Sigamos Haciendo Historia	49.9009
