= Municipalities of Zacatecas =

List of municipalities of Mexican state

Map of Mexico with Zacatecas highlighted

Zacatecas is a state in northern Mexico that is divided into 58 municipalities. According to the 2020 INEGI census, it is the state that has the 7th smallest population with 1,622,138 inhabitants and the 8th largest by land area spanning 75,275.3 square kilometres (29,064.0 sq mi).

Municipalities in Zacatecas are administratively autonomous of the state according to the 115th article of the 1917 Constitution of Mexico. Every three years, citizens elect a municipal president (Spanish: presidente municipal) by a plurality voting system who heads a concurrently elected municipal council (ayuntamiento) responsible for providing all the public services for their constituents. The municipal council consists of a variable number of trustees and councillors (regidores y síndicos). Municipalities are responsible for public services (such as water and sewerage), street lighting, public safety, traffic, and the maintenance of public parks, gardens and cemeteries. They may also assist the state and federal governments in education, emergency fire and medical services, environmental protection and maintenance of monuments and historical landmarks. Since 1984, they have had the power to collect property taxes and user fees, although more funds are obtained from the state and federal governments than from their own income.

The largest municipality by population in Zacatecas is Fresnillo, with 240,532 residents, and the smallest municipality by population is Susticacán with 1,365 residents. The largest municipality by area is the municipality of Mazapil which spans 12,143.26 km^{2} (4,688.54 mi^{2}), while Vetagrande is the smallest at 160.36 km^{2} (61.92 mi^{2}). The two newest municipalities are Trancoso, created out of Guadalupe in 2000, and Santa María de la Paz, separated in 2005 from Teúl.

== Municipalities ==
Largest municipalities in Zacatecas by population

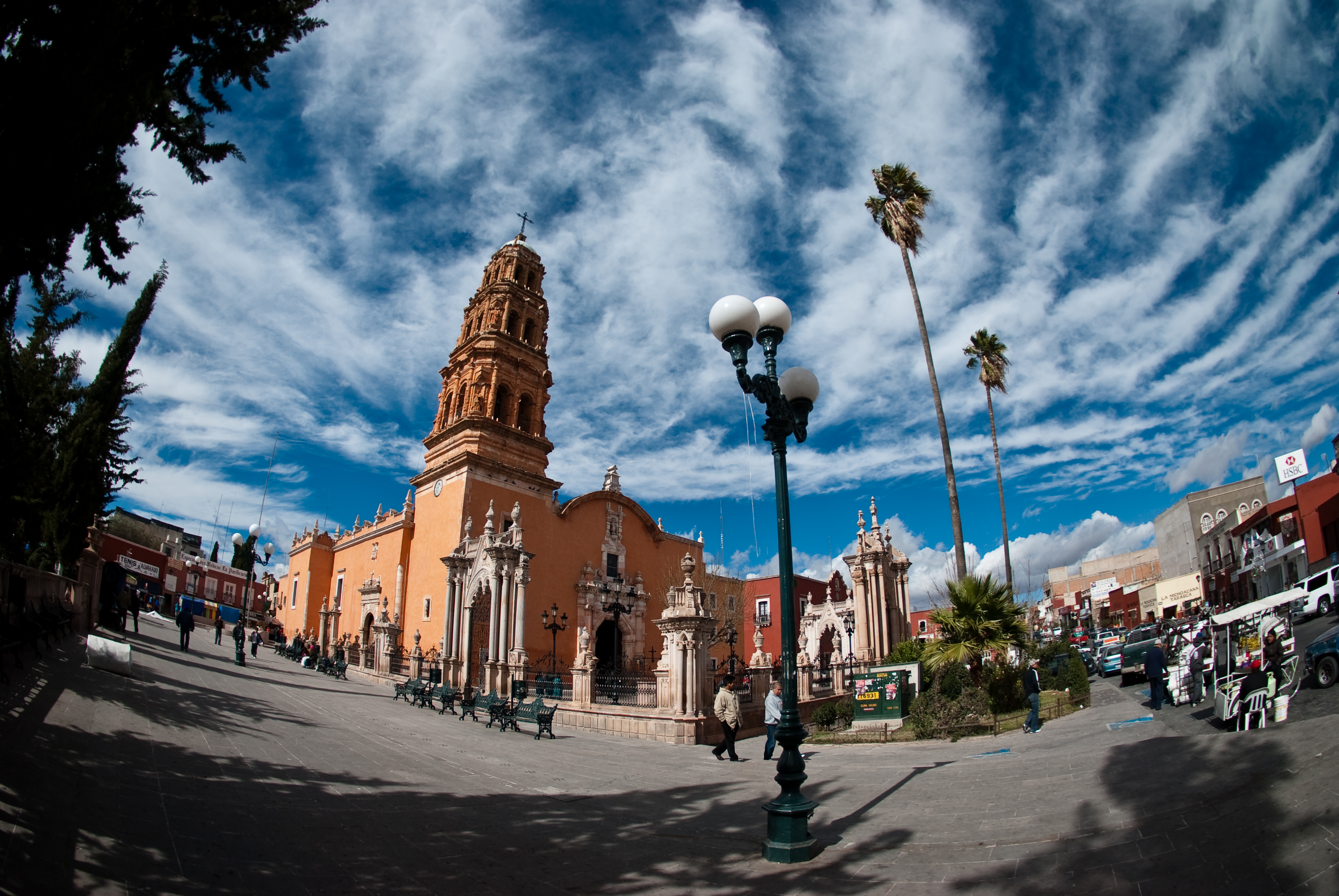
Fresnillo, Zacatecas's largest municipality by population

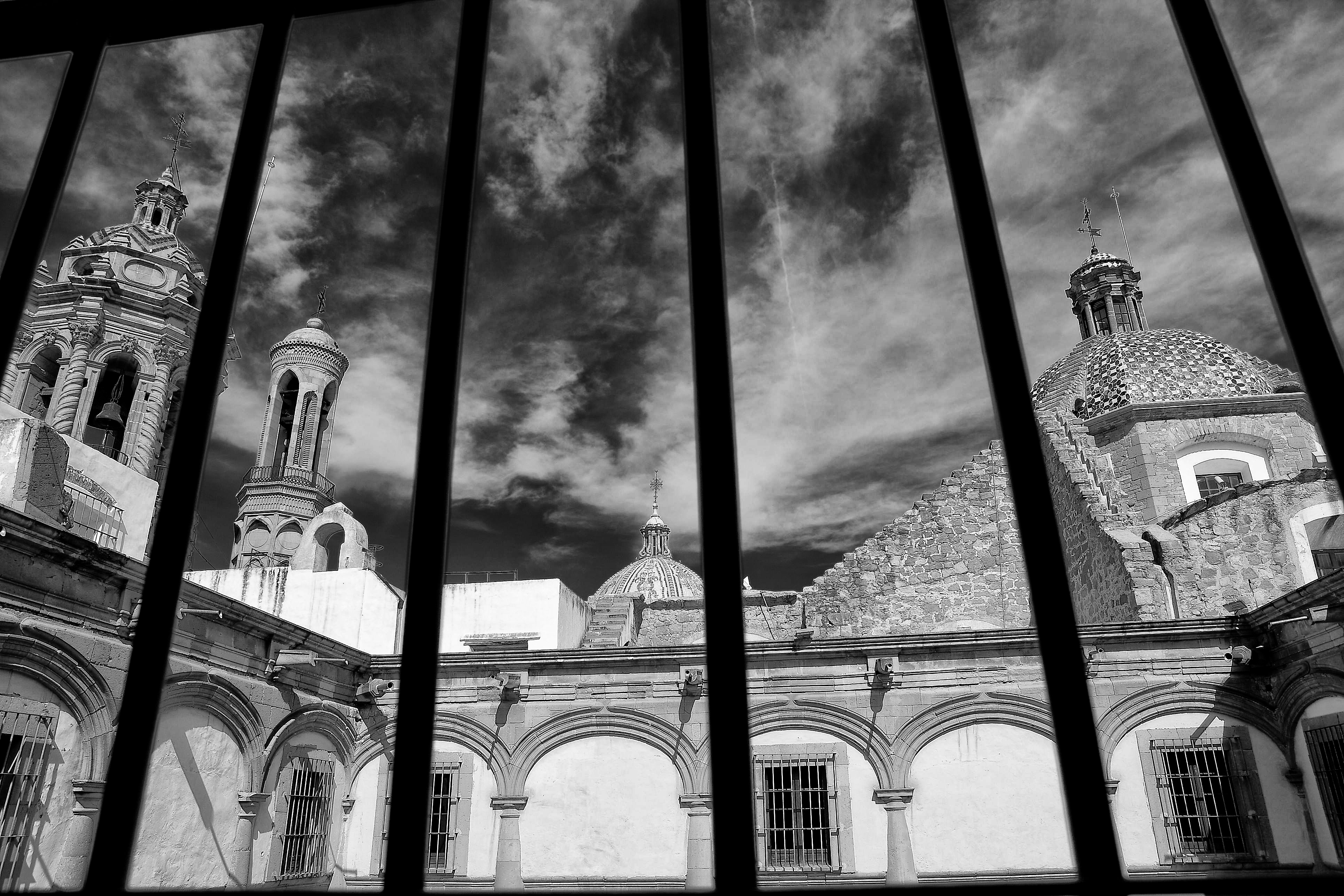
Guadalupe, the second largest municipality by population

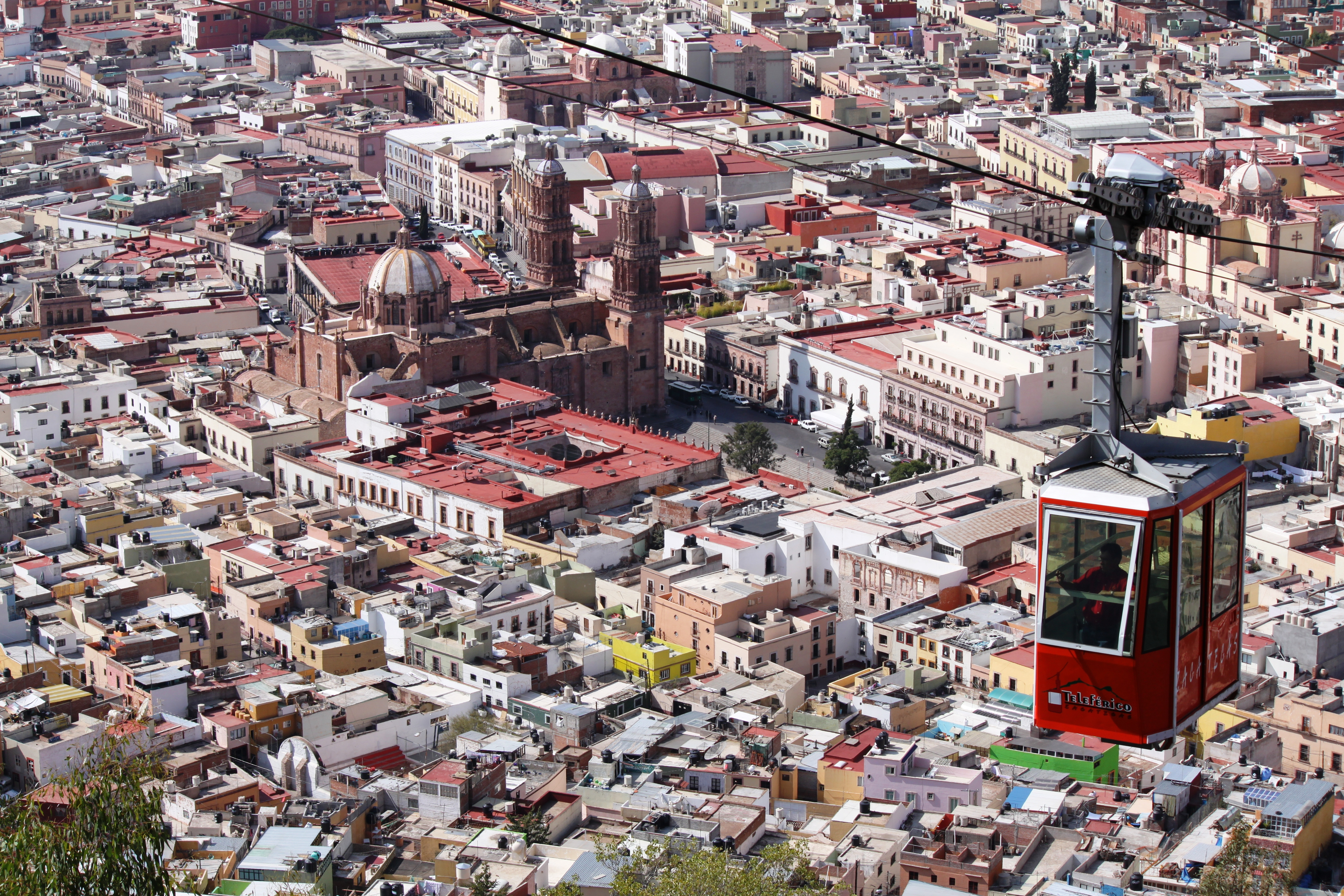
Zacatecas, capital and third largest municipality

State capital †

Municipalities of Zacatecas
Name	Municipal Seat	Population (2020)	Population (2010)	Change	Land area (km^{2})		Population density (2020)	Incorporation date
Name	Municipal Seat	Population (2020)	Population (2010)	Change	km^{2}	sq mi	Population density (2020)	Incorporation date
Apozol	Apozol	6,260	6,314	−0.9%	293.631	113.372	21.3/km^{2} (55.2/sq mi)	August 19, 1916
Apulco	Apulco	4,942	5,005	−1.3%	203.03	78.39	24.3/km^{2} (63.0/sq mi)	August 19, 1916
Atolinga	San Cayetano	2,277	2,692	−15.4%	281.968	108.868	8.1/km^{2} (20.9/sq mi)	October 29, 1833
Benito Juárez	Florencia	4,493	4,372	+2.8%	329.698	127.297	13.6/km^{2} (35.3/sq mi)	November 14, 1964
Calera	Víctor Rosales	45,759	39,917	+14.6%	388.387	149.957	117.8/km^{2} (305.1/sq mi)	August 19, 1916
Cañitas	Cañitas de Felipe Pescador	8,255	8,239	+0.2%	450.52	173.95	18.3/km^{2} (47.5/sq mi)	November 19, 1958
Chalchihuites	Chalchihuites	10,086	10,565	−4.5%	903.025	348.660	11.2/km^{2} (28.9/sq mi)	1825
Concepción del Oro	Concepción del Oro	12,115	12,803	−5.4%	2,423.522	935.727	5.0/km^{2} (12.9/sq mi)	August 19, 1916
Cuauhtémoc (Note: Cuauhtémoc was originally incorporated as San Pedro Piedra Gorda, changing its name on January 4, 1950.)	San Pedro Piedra Gorda	13,466	11,915	+13.0%	325.204	125.562	41.4/km^{2} (107.2/sq mi)	August 19, 1916
El Plateado	El Plateado de Joaquín Amaro	1,579	1,609	−1.9%	354.501	136.874	4.5/km^{2} (11.5/sq mi)	August 19, 1916
El Salvador	El Salvador	2,509	2,710	−7.4%	625.226	241.401	4.0/km^{2} (10.4/sq mi)	November 14, 1964
Fresnillo	Fresnillo	240,532	213,139	+12.9%	5,104.663	1,970.921	47.1/km^{2} (122.0/sq mi)	January 17, 1825
Genaro Codina (Note: Genaro Codina was originally incorporated as San José de la Ysla, changing its name on December 31, 1957.)	Genaro Codina	8,168	8,104	+0.8%	796.786	307.641	10.3/km^{2} (26.6/sq mi)	October 29, 1833
General Enrique Estrada	General Enrique Estrada	6,644	5,894	+12.7%	198.187	76.520	33.5/km^{2} (86.8/sq mi)	November 14, 1964
General Francisco R. Murguía (Note: General Francisco R. Murguía was originally incorporated as Nieves, changing its name on November 14, 1964.)	Nieves	20,191	21,974	−8.1%	5,034.261	1,943.739	4.0/km^{2} (10.4/sq mi)	January 17, 1825
General Pánfilo Natera (Note: General Pánfilo Natera was originally incorporated as La Blanca, changing its name on March 15, 1964.)	General Pánfilo Natera	23,526	22,346	+5.3%	443.177	171.112	53.1/km^{2} (137.5/sq mi)	July 21, 1928
Guadalupe	Guadalupe	211,740	159,991	+32.3%	819.044	316.235	258.5/km^{2} (669.6/sq mi)	October 29, 1833
Huanusco	Huanusco	4,547	4,306	+5.6%	373.284	144.126	12.2/km^{2} (31.5/sq mi)	August 19, 1916
Jalpa	Jalpa	25,296	23,557	+7.4%	719.782	277.909	35.1/km^{2} (91.0/sq mi)	October 29, 1833
Jerez	Jerez de García Salinas	59,910	57,610	+4.0%	1,547.193	597.375	38.7/km^{2} (100.3/sq mi)	January 17, 1825
Jiménez del Teul (Note: Jiménez del Teul was originally incorporated as San Andrés del Téul, changing its name on January 9, 1935.)	Jiménez del Teul	4,465	4,584	−2.6%	1,204.779	465.168	3.7/km^{2} (9.6/sq mi)	August 19, 1916
Juan Aldama (Note: Juan Aldama was originally incorporated as San Juan del Mezquital, changing its name on April 24, 1935.)	Juan Aldama	19,749	20,543	−3.9%	624.971	241.303	31.6/km^{2} (81.8/sq mi)	October 29, 1833
Juchipila	Juchipila	12,251	12,284	−0.3%	339.49	131.08	36.1/km^{2} (93.5/sq mi)	January 17, 1825
Loreto (Note: Loreto was originally incorporated as Bimbaletes, changing its name on October 3, 1956.)	Loreto	53,709	48,365	+11.0%	430.213	166.106	124.8/km^{2} (323.3/sq mi)	October 7, 1931
Luis Moya (Note: Luis Moya was originally incorporated as San Francisco de los Adames, changing its name on January 9, 1935.)	Luis Moya	13,184	12,234	+7.8%	177.332	68.468	74.3/km^{2} (192.6/sq mi)	February 5, 1857
Mazapil	Mazapil	17,774	17,813	−0.2%	12,143.256	4,688.537	1.5/km^{2} (3.8/sq mi)	January 17, 1825
Melchor Ocampo (Note: Melchor Ocampo was originally incorporated as San Pedro Ocampo, changing its name on January 9, 1935.)	Melchor Ocampo	2,736	2,662	+2.8%	1,885.382	727.950	1.5/km^{2} (3.8/sq mi)	August 19, 1916
Mezquital del Oro	Mezquital del Oro	2,451	2,584	−5.1%	487.82	188.35	5.0/km^{2} (13.0/sq mi)	1825
Miguel Auza (Note: Miguel Auza was originally incorporated as San Miguel del Mezquital, changing its name on January 9, 1935.)	Miguel Auza	23,713	22,296	+6.4%	1,108.308	427.920	21.4/km^{2} (55.4/sq mi)	October 29, 1833
Momax	Momax	2,446	2,529	−3.3%	162.23	62.64	15.1/km^{2} (39.1/sq mi)	October 29, 1833
Monte Escobedo	Monte Escobedo	8,683	8,929	−2.8%	1,612.123	622.444	5.4/km^{2} (13.9/sq mi)	October 29, 1833
Morelos (Note: Morelos was originally incorporated as Chupaderos, changing its name on May 5, 1894.)	Morelos	13,207	11,493	+14.9%	181.363	70.025	72.8/km^{2} (188.6/sq mi)	February 8, 1869
Moyahua	Moyahua de Estrada	4,530	4,563	−0.7%	541.729	209.163	8.4/km^{2} (21.7/sq mi)	1825
Nochistlán	Nochistlán de Mejía	27,945	27,932	0.0%	880.01	339.77	31.8/km^{2} (82.2/sq mi)	1825
Noria de Ángeles (Note: Noria de Ángeles was originally incorporated as Ángeles, changing its name on August 19, 1916.)	Noria de Ángeles	16,284	15,607	+4.3%	409.512	158.113	39.8/km^{2} (103.0/sq mi)	October 29, 1833
Ojocaliente	Ojocaliente	44,144	40,740	+8.4%	646.428	249.587	68.3/km^{2} (176.9/sq mi)	February 5, 1857
Pánuco	Pánuco	17,577	16,875	+4.2%	587.558	226.857	29.9/km^{2} (77.5/sq mi)	October 29, 1833
Pinos	Pinos	72,241	69,844	+3.4%	3,176.943	1,226.625	22.7/km^{2} (58.9/sq mi)	January 17, 1825
Río Grande	Río Grande	64,535	62,693	+2.9%	1,842.931	711.560	35.0/km^{2} (90.7/sq mi)	October 29, 1833
Saín Alto	Saín Alto	21,844	21,533	+1.4%	1,418.291	547.605	15.4/km^{2} (39.9/sq mi)	January 17, 1825
Santa María de la Paz	Santa María de la Paz	2,767	2,821	−1.9%	279.097	107.760	9.9/km^{2} (25.7/sq mi)	January 1, 2005
Sombrerete	Sombrerete	63,665	61,188	+4.0%	3,610.545	1,394.039	17.6/km^{2} (45.7/sq mi)	January 17, 1825
Susticacán	Susticacán	1,365	1,360	+0.4%	200.096	77.257	6.8/km^{2} (17.7/sq mi)	October 29, 1833
Tabasco (Note: Tabasco changed its name to Villa del Refujio from 1916 to 1938.)	Tabasco	16,588	15,656	+6.0%	411.261	158.789	40.3/km^{2} (104.5/sq mi)	October 29, 1833
Tepechitlán	Tepechitlán	8,321	8,215	+1.3%	545.888	210.769	15.2/km^{2} (39.5/sq mi)	October 29, 1833
Tepetongo	Tepetongo	6,490	7,090	−8.5%	726.362	280.450	8.9/km^{2} (23.1/sq mi)	October 29, 1833
Teúl (Note: Melchor Ocampo was originally incorporated as San Juan del Téul, changing its name on January 9, 1935.)	Teúl de González Ortega	5,356	5,506	−2.7%	681.309	263.055	7.9/km^{2} (20.4/sq mi)	October 29, 1833
Tlaltenango	Tlaltenango de Sánchez Román	27,302	25,493	+7.1%	747.927	288.776	36.5/km^{2} (94.5/sq mi)	January 17, 1825
Trancoso	Trancoso	20,455	16,934	+20.8%	221.352	85.464	92.4/km^{2} (239.3/sq mi)	January 1, 2000
Trinidad García de la Cadena (Note: Trinidad García de la Cardena was originally incorporated as Estanzuela, changing its name on May 4, 1935.)	Trinidad García de la Cadena	3,362	3,013	+11.6%	307.943	118.897	10.9/km^{2} (28.3/sq mi)	August 19, 1916
Valparaíso	Valparaíso	32,461	33,323	−2.6%	5,722.465	2,209.456	5.7/km^{2} (14.7/sq mi)	October 29, 1833
Vetagrande	Vetagrande	10,276	9,353	+9.9%	160.362	61.916	64.1/km^{2} (166.0/sq mi)	October 29, 1833
Villa de Cos (Note: Villa de Cos was originally incorporated as San Cosme, changing its name on July 27, 1845.)	Villa de Cos	34,623	34,328	+0.9%	6,593.771	2,545.869	5.3/km^{2} (13.6/sq mi)	October 29, 1833
Villa García	Villa García	19,525	18,269	+6.9%	342.621	132.287	57.0/km^{2} (147.6/sq mi)	August 19, 1916
Villa González Ortega (Note: Villa González Ortega was originally incorporated as El Carro, changing its name on November 29, 1922.)	Villa González Ortega	13,208	12,893	+2.4%	433.025	167.192	30.5/km^{2} (79.0/sq mi)	July 19, 1890
Villa Hidalgo (Note: Villa Hidalgo was originally incorporated as Santa Rita, changing its name on January 9, 1935.)	Villa Hidalgo	19,446	18,490	+5.2%	376.31	145.29	51.7/km^{2} (133.8/sq mi)	August 19, 1916
Villanueva	Villanueva	31,558	29,395	+7.4%	2,184.719	843.525	14.4/km^{2} (37.4/sq mi)	January 17, 1825
Zacatecas	Zacatecas†	149,607	138,176	+8.3%	442.612	170.893	338.0/km^{2} (875.4/sq mi)	January 17, 1825
Zacatecas	—	1,622,138	1,490,668	+8.8%	75,275.3	29,064.0	21.5/km^{2} (55.8/sq mi)	—
Mexico	—	126,014,024	112,336,538	+12.2%	1,960,646.7	757,009.9	64.3/km^{2} (166.5/sq mi)	—

== Defunct municipalities ==
1. Sauceda, integrated into Vetagrande in 1918.
