= Huitzila, Zacatecas =

Town in Zacatecas, Mexico

Huitzila
- Town
- Location within Zacatecas Location within Mexico
- Coordinates: 21°13′19″N 103°36′27″W
- Country: Mexico
- State: Zacatecas
- Municipality: Teúl de González Ortega
- Elevation: 1,663 m (5,456 ft)
- Time zone: UTC−6 (Zona Centro)
- Postal code: 32047

Huitzila is a small town located in the Sierra Madre Occidental in the far south of the Mexican state of Zacatecas. It is part of the municipality of Teúl de González Ortega. It is often grouped with its close neighbour, Milpillas de Allende. The two towns are connected by road to Zacatecas, Guadalajara and Benito Juárez.

The main economic activity in the town is based around cattle ranching and other agriculture, although the production of tequila is also important to the area, with 6 km^{2} planted in blue agave for the production of this drink. Local mezcal distilleries include El Zacatecano and Huitzila Mezcal.

The town's population are predominantly Mestizo and Roman Catholic, with the local church being that of San Antonio de Padua. The population is declining slightly, due to emigration to Guadalajara and the United States.
