= Trinidad García de la Cadena, Zacatecas =

Trinidad García de la Cadena
- Municipality
- Location of Trinidad García de la Cadena Trinidad García de la Cadena (Mexico)
- Coordinates: 21°12′36″N 103°27′52″W
- Country: Mexico
- State: Zacatecas
- Established: 19 August 1916
- Seat: Trinidad García de la Cadena

Government
  - Municipal president: Arcelia Muro Guzmán

Area
  - Total: 307.1 km^{2} (118.6 sq mi)
- Elevation (of seat): 1,744 m (5,722 ft)

Population (2020 Census)
  - Total: 3,362
  - Density: 10.95/km^{2} (28.35/sq mi)
  - Seat: 2,721
- Time zone: UTC-6 (Central)
- Postal codes: 99830–99855
- Area code: 467
- Website: Official website

Trinidad García de la Cadena is a municipality in the Mexican state of Zacatecas, located approximately 200 kilometres (120 mi) southwest of Zacatecas City, the state capital. It is named after General Trinidad García de la Cadena, governor of Zacatecas from 1869 to 1870 and from 1876 to 1880.

== Geography ==
The municipality of Trinidad García de la Cadena lies at an elevation between 900 and 2,200 metres (3,000–7,200 ft) in the foothills of the Sierra Madre Occidental in southwestern Zacatecas. It borders the Zacatecan municipalities of Teúl de González Ortega to the north, and Mezquital del Oro to the east, and the Jaliscan municipalities of San Cristóbal de la Barranca to the south and Tequila to the west. The municipality covers an area of 307.1 square kilometres (118.6 sq mi) and comprises 0.4% of the state's area.

As of 2009, 17.5% of the land in Trinidad García de la Cadena is used for agriculture. The remainder of the land cover comprises temperate forest (43.2%), tropical forest (22.1), and grassland (16.6%), and urban areas (0.6%). The municipality is situated in the drainage basin of the Cuixtla and Juchipila Rivers, both tributaries of the Río Grande de Santiago.

=== Climate ===
Trinidad García de la Cadena's climate ranges from temperate to tropical depending on elevation, with dry winters. Average temperatures in the municipality range between 16 and 24 °C (61–75 °F), and average annual precipitation ranges between 800 and 1,000 millimetres (31–39 in).

Climate data for Garcia de la Cadena weather station at 21°12′25″N 103°27′32″W, 1712 m above sea level (1981–2010 averages, 1951–2010 extremes)
| Month | Jan | Feb | Mar | Apr | May | Jun | Jul | Aug | Sep | Oct | Nov | Dec | Year |
|---|---|---|---|---|---|---|---|---|---|---|---|---|---|
| Record high °C (°F) | 35.0 (95.0) | 34.0 (93.2) | 39.0 (102.2) | 40.0 (104.0) | 39.0 (102.2) | 38.0 (100.4) | 35.0 (95.0) | 38.0 (100.4) | 33.0 (91.4) | 39.0 (102.2) | 33.0 (91.4) | 35.0 (95.0) | 40.0 (104.0) |
| Mean daily maximum °C (°F) | 24.5 (76.1) | 26.5 (79.7) | 28.7 (83.7) | 30.4 (86.7) | 32.4 (90.3) | 30.0 (86.0) | 26.9 (80.4) | 27.0 (80.6) | 26.6 (79.9) | 26.9 (80.4) | 26.0 (78.8) | 24.9 (76.8) | 27.6 (81.7) |
| Daily mean °C (°F) | 14.3 (57.7) | 15.7 (60.3) | 17.4 (63.3) | 19.5 (67.1) | 21.8 (71.2) | 21.9 (71.4) | 20.3 (68.5) | 20.1 (68.2) | 19.8 (67.6) | 18.5 (65.3) | 16.3 (61.3) | 14.8 (58.6) | 18.4 (65.1) |
| Mean daily minimum °C (°F) | 4.0 (39.2) | 5.0 (41.0) | 6.2 (43.2) | 8.5 (47.3) | 11.3 (52.3) | 13.8 (56.8) | 13.6 (56.5) | 13.2 (55.8) | 13.1 (55.6) | 10.0 (50.0) | 6.5 (43.7) | 4.5 (40.1) | 9.1 (48.4) |
| Record low °C (°F) | −6.0 (21.2) | −6.0 (21.2) | −4.0 (24.8) | −2.0 (28.4) | 0.0 (32.0) | 3.0 (37.4) | 8.0 (46.4) | 7.0 (44.6) | 5.0 (41.0) | −3.0 (26.6) | −5.0 (23.0) | −9.0 (15.8) | −9.0 (15.8) |
| Average precipitation mm (inches) | 20.3 (0.80) | 13.7 (0.54) | 3.4 (0.13) | 2.5 (0.10) | 25.7 (1.01) | 169.6 (6.68) | 221.6 (8.72) | 206.0 (8.11) | 133.8 (5.27) | 43.7 (1.72) | 6.0 (0.24) | 7.7 (0.30) | 854.0 (33.62) |
| Average rainy days (≥ 1 mm) | 2.0 | 1.2 | 0.3 | 0.6 | 2.8 | 13.1 | 17.1 | 16.6 | 13.0 | 4.8 | 1.0 | 1.8 | 74.3 |
Source: Servicio Meteorológico Nacional

== History ==
Trinidad García de la Cadena is located in territory that was inhabited by the Caxcan people prior to Spanish contact. It was formerly a hacienda named La Estanzuela, whose existence dates at least to 1793. After Mexican independence, it became part of the partido of Tlaltenango. The hacienda was expropriated by the state in 1869, and after a further legal battle, the sale of its land to the citizens of La Estanzuela was finalized on 27 July 1883.

When the partidos of Zacatecas were abolished in 1916, Estanzuela became an independent municipality. On 4 May 1935, it changed its name to García de la Cadena, in honour of the former governor of Zacatecas. It acquired its present name on 15 November 1986.

== Administration ==
The municipal government of Trinidad García de la Cadena comprises a president, a councillor (Spanish: síndico), and seven trustees (regidores), four elected by relative majority and three by proportional representation. The current president of the municipality is Arcelia Muro Guzmán.

== Demographics ==
In the 2020 INEGI Census, Trinidad García de la Cadena recorded a population of 3362 inhabitants living in 1080 households. The 2010 Census recorded a population of 3013 inhabitants in Trinidad García de la Cadena.

There are 35 inhabited localities in the municipality, of which only the municipal seat, also called Trinidad García de la Cadena, is classified as urban. It recorded a population of 2721 inhabitants in the 2020 Census.

According to the 2020 Census, 4% of the population in Trinidad García de la Cadena speaks the Huichol language.

== Economy and infrastructure ==
The main economic activity in Trinidad García de la Cadena is agriculture. In the 2015 Intercensal Survey, 36% of the municipality's workforce was employed in the primary sector, 22% in the secondary sector, 10% in commerce, and 31% in services. The main crops grown in Trinidad García de la Cadena are corn and agave. Crops more recently introduced to the area include chia seed and Persian lime.

Federal Highway 23 runs north to south through the municipality, connecting it to Jerez and Fresnillo in the north, and Zapopan and Guadalajara in the south.
