= XHRRZ-TV =

Río Grande, Zacatecas; Mexico
- Channels: Analog: 7 (VHF); Digital: 23 (assigned)

Programming
- Affiliations: Independent

Ownership
- Owner: Patronato Pro-Televisión de Río Grande en Zac.

History
- Founded: February 12, 1986
- Last air date: 2015 (expiration of permit)
- Call sign meaning: Río Grande Zacatecas

Technical information
- ERP: Analog: .1 kW
- Transmitter coordinates: 23°50′00″N 103°01′51″W

Links
- Website: XHRRZ (Facebook)

XHRRZ-TV was a broadcast television station on channel 7 in Río Grande, Zacatecas, Mexico, operated by the municipal government.

== History ==
XHRRZ was permitted on February 12, 1986 after having operated for a time on channel 6 to serve the village of Loma Prieta. It was permitted along with XHRIG-TV on channel 4, which was off the air for most of its permit life, though attempts were made to put it on air. XHRRZ, however, operated with local programming.

Both XHRRZ and XHRIG had their permits canceled in 2015 for failure to transition to a public or social use concession. The station continues to broadcast via cable.
