= Trancoso Municipality =

Trancoso Municipality may refer to

== Places ==
=== Mexico ===
- Trancoso Municipality, Zacatecas, a municipality in the State of Zacatecas

=== Portugal ===
- Trancoso Municipality, Portugal, a municipality in the district of Guarda
