= Melchor Ocampo Municipality, Zacatecas =

Melchor Ocampo
- Municipality
- Location of Melchor Ocampo in Zacatecas
- Coordinates: 24°49′52″N 101°38′33″W
- Country: Mexico
- State: Zacatecas
- Established: 19 August 1916
- Seat: Melchor Ocampo

Government
  - Municipal president: Rodolfo Cisneros Gallegos

Area
  - Total: 1,881.4 km^{2} (726.4 sq mi)
- Elevation (of seat): 2,030 m (6,660 ft)

Population (2020 Census)
  - Total: 2,736
  - Density: 1.454/km^{2} (3.766/sq mi)
  - Seat: 698
- Time zone: UTC-6 (Central)
- Postal codes: 98220–98229
- Area code: 842

Melchor Ocampo is a municipality in the Mexican state of Zacatecas, located approximately 250 kilometres (160 mi) north of Zacatecas City, the state capital. It is named after Melchor Ocampo.

== Geography ==
The municipality of Melchor Ocampo lies at an elevation between 1,200 and 2,800 metres (3,900–9,200 ft) in the Sierra Madre Oriental in northern Zacatecas. It borders Mazapil Municipality in Zacatecas to the south, and the Coahuilan municipalities of Viesca to the west, Parras to the north, and Saltillo to the east. The municipality covers an area of 1,881.4 square kilometres (726.4 sq mi) and comprises 2.5% of the state's area.

As of 2009, 1% of the land in Melchor Ocampo is used for agriculture, and another 1% is covered by forest, but the Meseta Central matorral is the predominant land cover (98%) in the municipality. Melchor Ocampo is situated in the drainage basin of the Laguna de Viesca in the Bolsón de Mapimí.

Melchor Ocampo's climate ranges from semiarid to arid desert. Average temperatures in the municipality range between 12 and 22 °C (54–72 °F), and average annual precipitation ranges between 200 and 600 millimetres (7.9–23.6 in).

== History ==
Melchor Ocampo is located in territory that was inhabited by the Guachichil and Irritila peoples prior to Spanish contact. Permanent settlement in the area dates to 1872 with the founding of the San Pedro hacienda, where a railway station was built in 1903.

The municipality of San Pedro Ocampo was established on 19 August 1916, and on 9 January 1935, it changed its name to Melchor Ocampo. Deposits of gold, silver and lead were discovered in the municipality in the 1930s.

== Administration ==
The municipal government of Melchor Ocampo comprises a president, a councillor (Spanish: síndico), and seven trustees (regidores), four elected by relative majority and three by proportional representation. The current president of the municipality is Rodolfo Cisneros Gallegos.

== Demographics ==
In the 2020 INEGI census, Melchor Ocampo recorded a population of 2736 inhabitants living in 721 households. The 2010 Census recorded a population of 2662 inhabitants in Melchor Ocampo.

There are 28 inhabited localities in the municipality, of which only the municipal seat, also called Melchor Ocampo, is classified as urban. It recorded a population of 698 inhabitants in the 2020 Census.

== Economy ==
In the 2015 Intercensal Survey, 30% of Melchor Ocampo's workforce was employed in the primary sector, 44% in the secondary sector, 5% in commerce, and 21% in services. The main crops grown are alfalfa, and cactus pear for fodder. A small mine in the municipality called La Fé del Norte produces 120 tonnes of zinc–lead ore per day as of 2020.
