= Miguel Auza Municipality =

Miguel Auza
- Municipality
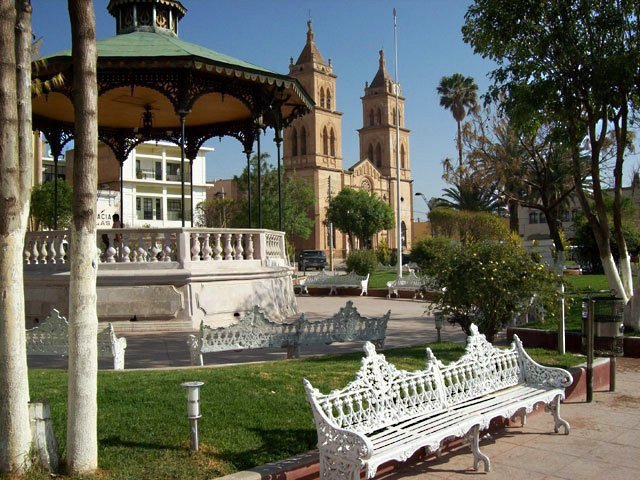
- The plaza de armas of the municipal seat of Miguel Auza

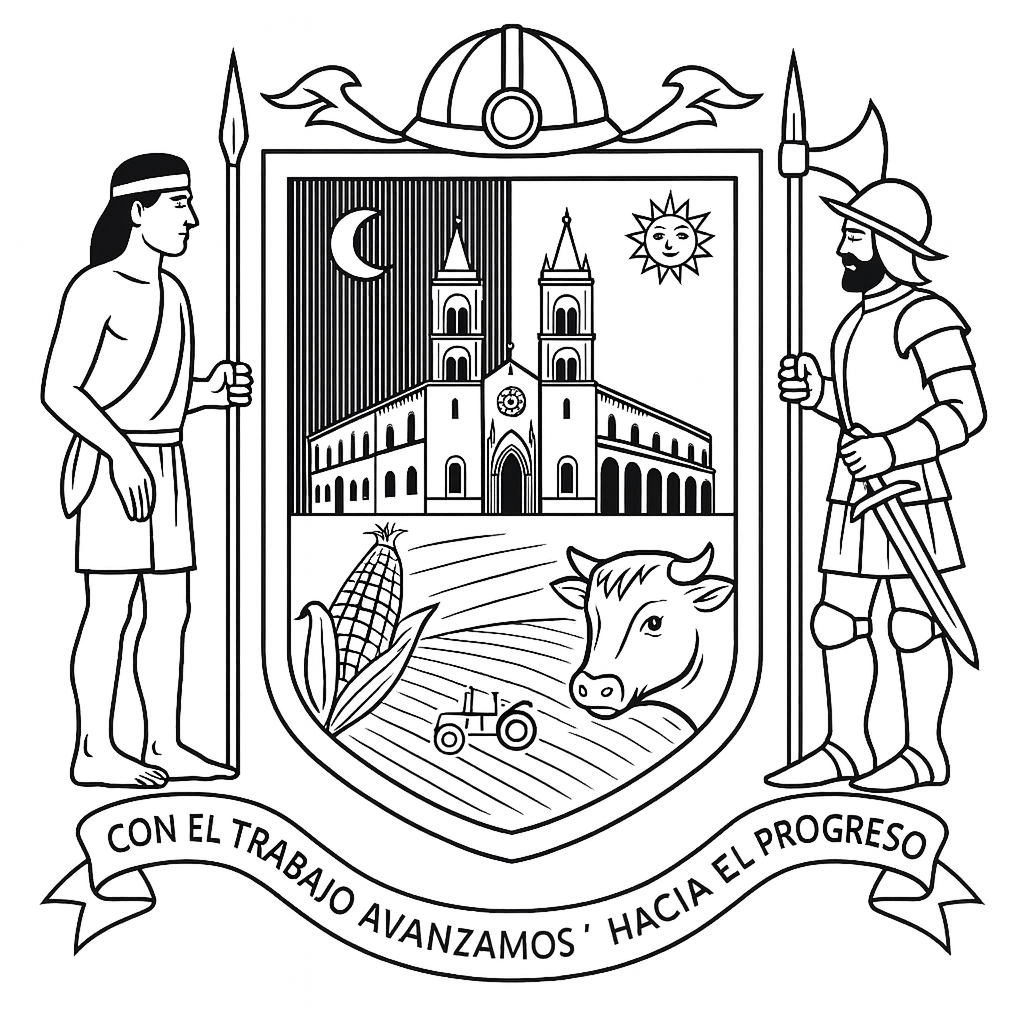
- Coat of arms

- Location of Miguel Auza Miguel Auza (Mexico)
- Coordinates: 24°17′38″N 103°26′59″W
- Country: Mexico
- State: Zacatecas
- Established: 29 October 1833
- Seat: Miguel Auza

Government
  - President: José Alfredo González Perales
  - Federal electoral district: Zacatecas's 1st

Area
  - Total: 1,108.308 km^{2} (427.920 sq mi)
- Elevation (of seat): 1,960 m (6,430 ft)

Population (2010 Census)
  - Total: 22,296
  - Estimate (2015 Intercensal Survey): 23,827
  - Density: 20.117/km^{2} (52.103/sq mi)
  - Seat: 13,551
- Time zone: UTC-6 (Central)
- Postal code: 98330–98340
- Area code: 433
- Website: miguelauzazac.net

Miguel Auza is a municipality in the Mexican state of Zacatecas, located approximately 190 kilometres (120 mi) northwest of the state capital.

== Geography ==
The municipality of Miguel Auza is located at an elevation between 1,800 and 2,600 metres (5,900–8,500 ft) on the Mexican Plateau in northern Zacatecas. It borders the Zacatecan municipalities of Juan Aldama to the northeast, Río Grande to the southeast, and Sombrerete to the south. It also borders the municipalities of Cuencamé and Santa Clara in Durango to the northwest and north respectively. The municipality covers an area of 1,108.308 square kilometres (427.920 sq mi) and comprises 1.5% of the state's area.

As of 2009, 72% of the land in Miguel Auza is used for agriculture, while the remaining land cover comprises grassland (21%), forest (3%) and matorral (3%). Most of the municipality lies in the endorheic basin of the Aguanaval River and is drained by one of its tributaries, the Santiago River, which originates at the Santiago Reservoir just west of the municipal seat. The southwestern part of the municipality lies in the basin of the Poanas River.

Miguel Auza has a semi-arid climate with dry winters. Average temperatures in the municipality range between 12 and 18 °C (54–64 °F), and average annual precipitation ranges between 400 and 700 millimetres (16–28 in).

== History ==
Prior to the arrival of the Spanish, the area of Miguel Auza was inhabited by the Zacateco people. The expedition of Francisco de Ibarra arrived in the area in 1554, founding the settlement of Real de San Miguel on 29 September. In 1770 it was renamed San Miguel de Mezquital in reference to the abundance of mesquite in the area.

After Zacatecas was admitted into independent Mexico, the municipal council of Miguel Auza was established within the partido and later district of Nieves (nowadays the municipality of General Francisco R. Murguía) on 29 October 1833. It became a free municipality on 19 August 1916. During the Mexican Revolution, Battles were fought in San Miguel in 1912 and in 1915. In 1935, the municipality was renamed in honour of General Miguel Auza Arrenechea (1822–1892), who was born in Sombrerete and fought in the Reform War and at the 1863 Siege of Puebla.

== Administration ==
The municipal government of Miguel Auza comprises a president, a councillor (Spanish: síndico), and thirteen trustees (regidores), eight elected by relative majority and five by proportional representation. The current president of the municipality is José Alfredo González Perales.

== Demographics ==
In the 2010 Mexican Census, the municipality of Miguel Auza recorded a population of 22,296 inhabitants living in 5075 households. The 2015 Intercensal Survey estimated a population of 23,827 inhabitants in Miguel Auza.

INEGI lists 50 localities in the municipality, of which only the municipal seat, also called Miguel Auza, is classified as urban. It recorded a population of 13,551 inhabitants in the 2010 Census.

== Economy and infrastructure ==
Miguel Auza's economy is oriented towards the primary and secondary sectors. The main crops grown are beans and alfalfa, Miguel Auza being located in Mexico's most important bean-growing region. Beef and dairy cattle are the main livestock raised. Miguel Auza also has a facility that processes silver, lead and zinc ore obtained from the Platosa mine in Durango. Federal Highway 49 generally follows the eastern border of Miguel Auza with the municipality of Juan Aldama.
