= Villa García, Zacatecas =

City and municipality in Zacatecas, Mexico

Coordinates: 22°09′40″N 101°57′07″W

Villa García
- Municipality
- Location in Mexico Villa García (Mexico)
- Country: Mexico
- State: Zacatecas
- Demonym: (in Spanish)
- Time zone: UTC−6 (CST)

Villa García Municipality is one of the 58 municipalities of the Mexican state of Zacatecas. It is located 140 kilometers (87 mi) from the city of Zacatecas, the capital of the state.

Villa García borders the municipality of Loreto in the north, Pinos in the southeast, and the states of Aguascalientes in the east and Jalisco in the south. Villa García has a population of 18,269 with an elevation of 2,100 meters (6,900 ft) above sea level.

The primary communities are Villa Garcia, the administrative seat of the municipality, with a population of 5,499, El Copetillo (pop. 1,159), Aguagorda (pop. 1,042), Granadas (pop. 1,056), and Aguagordita (pop. 695).

The region holds an annual fair from 1 to 12 December in honor of Our Lady of Guadalupe. The municipality has a vibrant industry of sarapes which has been in decline in the last years, many locals call sarapes tapetes or forongos.
