= Morelos, Zacatecas =

Morelos
- Municipality
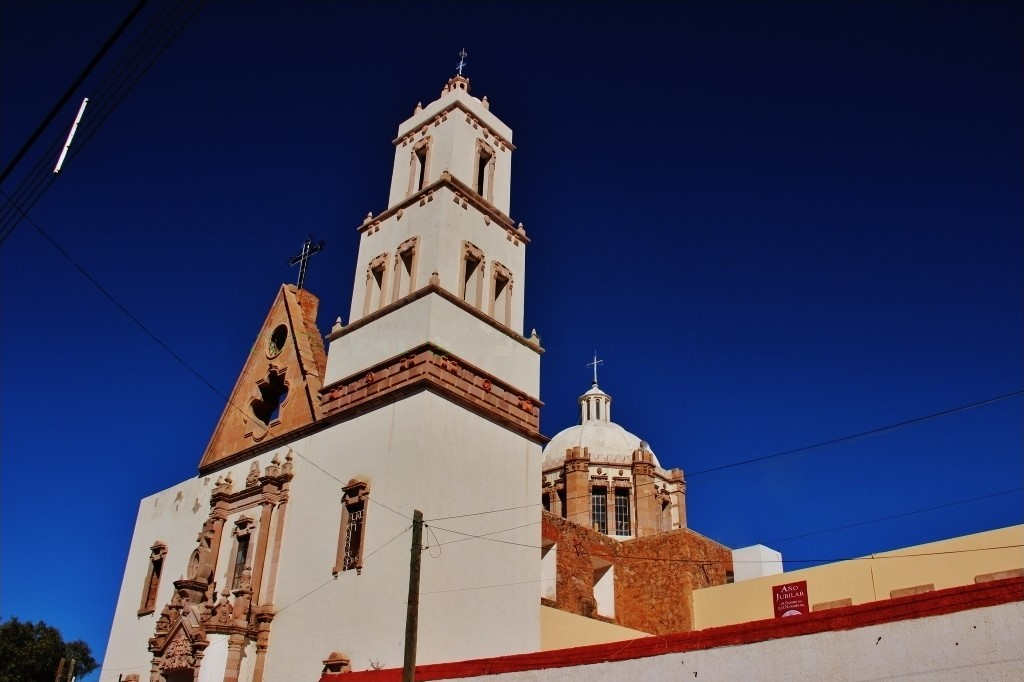
- Parish church of Saint Anthony of Padua in Morelos

- Location in Mexico Morelos (Mexico)
- Coordinates: 22°51′46″N 102°36′30″W
- Country: Mexico
- State: Zacatecas
- Established: 8 February 1869
- Seat: Morelos

Government
  - President: Margarita Robles de Santiago

Area
  - Total: 180.9 km^{2} (69.8 sq mi)
- Elevation (of seat): 2,321 m (7,615 ft)
- Highest elevation (Cerro San Gil): 2,603 m (8,540 ft)

Population (2020 Census)
  - Total: 13,207
  - Density: 73.01/km^{2} (189.1/sq mi)
  - Seat: 7,515
- Time zone: UTC-6 (Central)
- Postal codes: 98100–98113
- Area code: 492
- Website: Official website

Morelos is a semi-urban municipality in the Zacatecas metropolitan area in the Mexican state of Zacatecas.

== Geography ==
The municipality of Morelos is located at an elevation between 2,100 and 2,600 metres (6,900–8,500 ft) in central Zacatecas. It borders the municipalities of Calera to the northwest, Pánuco to the northeast, Vetagrande to the east, and the city of Zacatecas to the south. The municipality covers an area of 180.9 square kilometres (69.8 sq mi) and comprises 0.2% of the state's area.

As of 2009, 71% of the land in Morelos is used for agriculture. The remainder is covered by matorral (13.7%), grassland (12.6%) and urban areas (2.4%). The municipality lies in the endorheic basin of El Salado. The highest point of the municipality is Cerro San Gil in the Sierra de Zacatecas southeast of the town of Hacienda Nueva, with an elevation of 2,603 metres (8,540 ft) above sea level.

Morelos has a temperate semi-arid climate with dry winters. Average temperatures in the municipality range between 14 and 18 °C (57–64 °F), and average annual precipitation ranges between 400 and 500 millimetres (16–20 in).

== History ==
In pre-Hispanic times, the Morelos area was inhabited by the Cagihua tribe of the Zacateco people. Francisco de Ibarra passed through the area on 1 September 1554, giving it the name of Arroyo de los Chupaderos. Between 1610 and 1620, Antonio de Figueroa built and operated the first ranch in the area.

After independence, Chupaderos was administered by the municipality of Vetagrande. It was declared a separate municipality on 8 February 1869 and its first municipal assembly convened in 1871. On 5 May 1894, the municipality changed its name from Chupaderos to Morelos in honour of José María Morelos. The municipal seat inaugurated its first power plant in 1955 and its first potable water supply in 1966.

== Administration ==
The municipal government of Morelos comprises a president, a councillor (Spanish: síndico), and ten trustees (regidores), six elected by relative majority and four by proportional representation. The current president of the municipality is Margarita Robles de Santiago.

== Demographics ==
In the 2020 Census, the municipality of Morelos recorded a population of 13,207 inhabitants living in 3614 households. The 2010 Census recorded a population of 11,493 inhabitants in Morelos.

INEGI lists 28 inhabited localities in the municipality, of which two are classified as urban:

- the municipal seat, also called Morelos, which recorded a population of 7538 inhabitants in the 2020 Census; and
- Hacienda Nueva, located 2 kilometres (1.2 mi) south of the municipal seat, which recorded a population of 4029 inhabitants in the 2020 Census.

== Economy and infrastructure ==
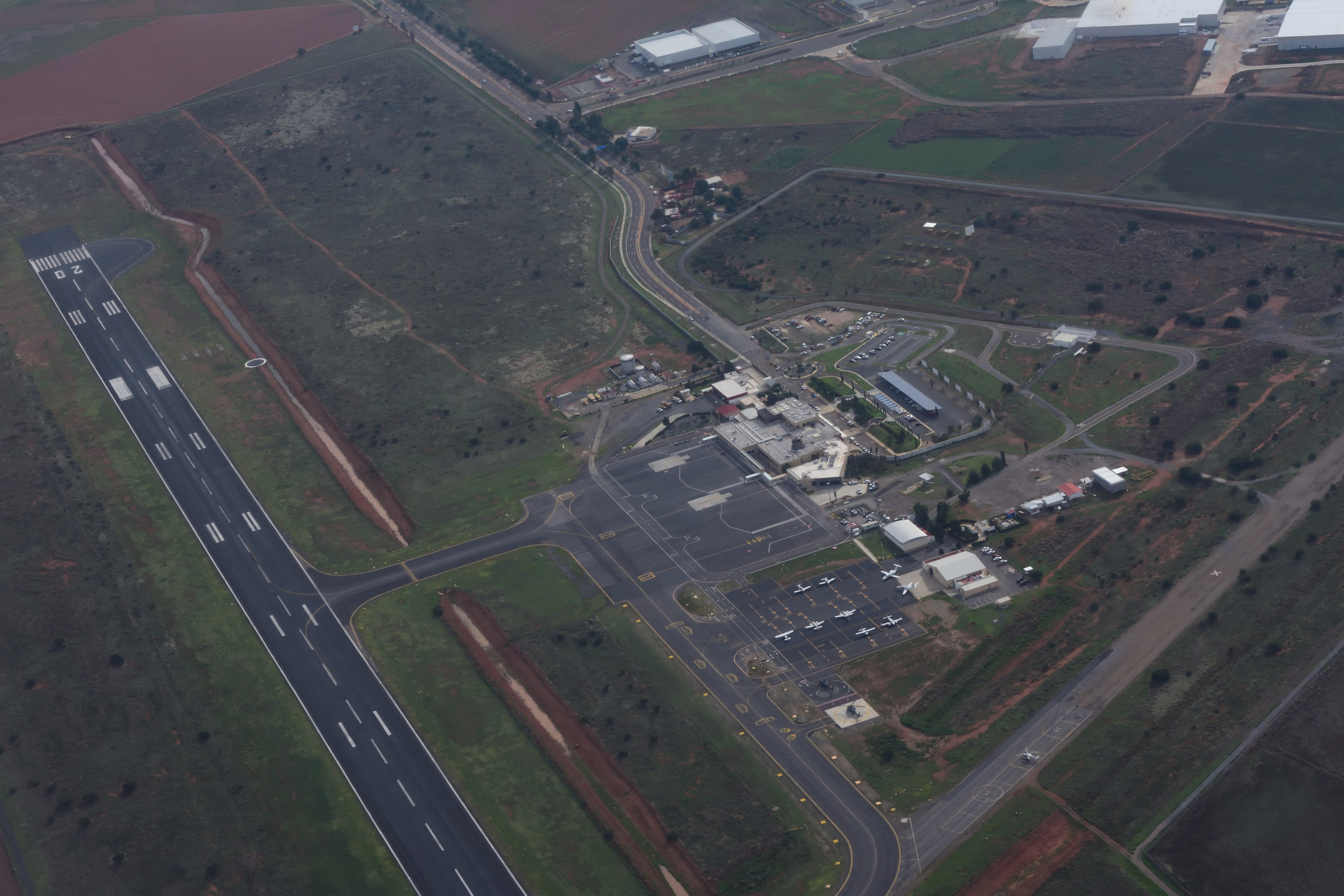
General Leobardo C. Ruiz International Airport, also known as Zacatecas International Airport, is located in the municipality of Morelos.

Economic activities in Morelos include agriculture and small businesses. Crops grown include corn, bean, barley, oats and chiles. CRUCEN (Centro Regional Universitario Centro Norte), a regional centre of the agriculturally focused Chapingo Autonomous University, is located in Morelos.

Federal Highways 45, 45D (the Zacatecas bypass), and 54 all intersect in the municipality. Zacatecas International Airport is located in the northern part of the municipality.

Peñoles operated the Francisco I. Madero zinc mine in the southwestern part of the municipality from 2001 to 2020.
