= Heladio Verver y Vargas =

Mexican politician

- Born: 9 November 1958 (age 67); Silao, Guanajuato, Mexico
- Occupation: Politician
- Political party: PRI

Heladio Gerardo Verver y Vargas Ramírez (born 9 November 1958) is a Mexican politician from the Institutional Revolutionary Party (PRI). In the 2009 mid-terms he was elected to the Chamber of Deputies to represent the third district of Zacatecas during the 61st session of Congress.
