= Mezquital del Oro =

- Municipality
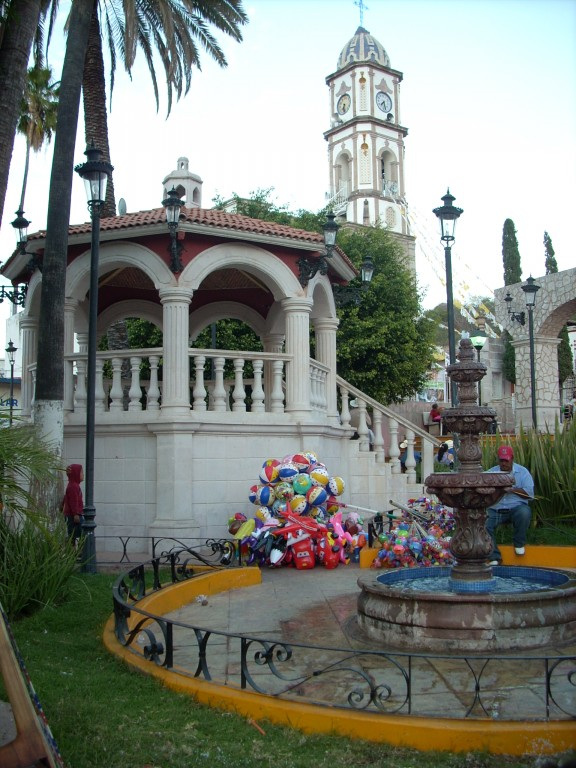
- The main plaza of Mezquital del Oro

- Location of Mezquital del Oro Mezquital del Oro (Mexico)
- Coordinates: 21°13′00″N 103°21′46″W
- Country: Mexico
- State: Zacatecas
- Established: 1825
- Seat: Mezquital del Oro

Government
  - Municipal president: Mónica Robarte Dávila

Area
  - Total: 486.5 km^{2} (187.8 sq mi)
- Elevation (of seat): 1,220 m (4,000 ft)

Population (2020 Census)
  - Total: 2,451
  - Density: 5.038/km^{2} (13.05/sq mi)
  - Seat: 1,136
- Time zone: UTC-6 (Central)
- Postal codes: 99860–99867
- Area code: 467

Mezquital del Oro is a municipality in the Mexican state of Zacatecas, located approximately 190 kilometres (120 mi) southwest of Zacatecas City, the state capital.

== Geography ==
The municipality of Mezquital del Oro lies at an elevation between 900 and 2,500 metres (3,000–8,200 ft) in the Sierra Madre Occidental in southwestern Zacatecas. It borders the Zacatecan municipalities of Trinidad García de la Cadena to the west, Teúl de González Ortega to the north, Juchipila to the northeast, and Moyahua de Estrada to the east. It also borders the Jaliscan municipalities of Ixtlahuacán del Río to the south and San Cristóbal de la Barranca to the southwest. The municipality covers an area of 486.5 square kilometres (187.8 sq mi) and comprises 0.6% of the state's area.

As of 2009, 5.5% of the land in Mezquital del Oro is used for agriculture. The remainder of the land comprises tropical forest (53.6%), temperate forest (23.6), and grassland (17.2%). The municipality is situated in the drainage basin of the Juchipila River, a tributary of the Río Grande de Santiago. Much of the municipality lies in the canyon of the Mezquital River, a tributary of the Juchipila.

Mezquital del Oro's climate ranges from temperate to tropical depending on elevation, with dry winters in either case. Average temperatures in the municipality range between 14 and 26 °C (57–79 °F), and average annual precipitation ranges between 700 and 1,000 millimetres (28–39 in).

Climate data for Mezquital del Oro weather station at 21°12′45″N 103°21′50″W, 1208 m above sea level (1981–2010 averages, 1951–2010 extremes)
Month	Jan	Feb	Mar	Apr	May	Jun	Jul	Aug	Sep	Oct	Nov	Dec	Year
Record high °C (°F)	39.0 (102.2)	40.0 (104.0)	42.0 (107.6)	41.0 (105.8)	43.0 (109.4)	42.5 (108.5)	39.5 (103.1)	39.0 (102.2)	39.0 (102.2)	41.0 (105.8)	37.0 (98.6)	37.0 (98.6)	43.0 (109.4)
Mean daily maximum °C (°F)	27.6 (81.7)	30.1 (86.2)	32.6 (90.7)	34.9 (94.8)	36.8 (98.2)	34.8 (94.6)	31.0 (87.8)	30.9 (87.6)	30.8 (87.4)	31.3 (88.3)	29.6 (85.3)	28.4 (83.1)	31.6 (88.9)
Daily mean °C (°F)	16.9 (62.4)	18.9 (66.0)	21.3 (70.3)	23.9 (75.0)	26.5 (79.7)	26.6 (79.9)	24.0 (75.2)	23.8 (74.8)	23.5 (74.3)	22.4 (72.3)	19.2 (66.6)	17.6 (63.7)	22.1 (71.8)
Mean daily minimum °C (°F)	6.3 (43.3)	7.6 (45.7)	9.9 (49.8)	13.0 (55.4)	16.2 (61.2)	18.4 (65.1)	16.9 (62.4)	16.7 (62.1)	16.2 (61.2)	13.4 (56.1)	8.8 (47.8)	6.7 (44.1)	12.5 (54.5)
Record low °C (°F)	−1.0 (30.2)	1.0 (33.8)	3.5 (38.3)	5.0 (41.0)	8.0 (46.4)	11.5 (52.7)	10.0 (50.0)	11.0 (51.8)	8.0 (46.4)	0.0 (32.0)	0.5 (32.9)	−4.0 (24.8)	−4.0 (24.8)
Average precipitation mm (inches)	18.3 (0.72)	9.9 (0.39)	2.2 (0.09)	1.6 (0.06)	19.1 (0.75)	139.0 (5.47)	218.3 (8.59)	213.0 (8.39)	119.2 (4.69)	45.9 (1.81)	12.1 (0.48)	4.9 (0.19)	803.5 (31.63)
Average rainy days (≥ 1 mm)	2.0	0.8	0.3	0.3	1.8	11.0	16.4	15.2	10.8	4.3	1.2	1.1	65.2
Source: Servicio Meteorológico Nacional

== History ==
Mezquital del Oro is located in territory that was inhabited by the Caxcan people prior to Spanish contact. The town of Mezquital del Oro was founded in the 1730s after gold was discovered there. Mesquital was named as a district in the partido of Juchipila in 1825. When partidos were abolished in 1916, Mezquital del Oro became an independent municipality. Gold production peaked in the 1910s, and continued until the last mine was abandoned in 1940.

== Administration ==
The municipal government of Mezquital del Oro comprises a president, a councillor (Spanish: síndico), and seven trustees (regidores), four elected by relative majority and three by proportional representation. The current president of the municipality is Mónica Rodarte Dávila.

== Demographics ==
In the 2020 INEGI census, Mezquital del Oro recorded a population of 2451 inhabitants living in 735 households. The 2010 Census recorded a population of 2584 inhabitants in Mezquital del Oro.

There are 52 inhabited localities in the municipality, of which only the municipal seat, also called Mezquital del Oro, is classified as urban. It recorded a population of 1136 inhabitants in the 2020 Census.

== Economy and infrastructure ==
Nowadays, the main economic activity in Mezquital del Oro is agriculture. In the 2015 Intercensal Survey, 40% of Mezquital del Oro's workforce was employed in the primary sector, 20% in the secondary sector, 7% in commerce, and 32% in services. The main crops grown in Mezquital del Oro are agave, forage grasses, and corn (grain and silage).

Federal Highway 23 runs through the westernmost corner of the municipality, connecting it to Jerez and Fresnillo in the north, and Zapopan and Guadalajara in the south.
