= Mateo Correa Magallanes =

Mexican Catholic priest and martyr (1866–1927)

Saint Mateo Correa Magallanes
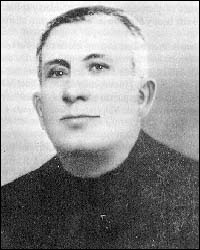

Martyr
- Born: July 23, 1866; Tepechitlán, Zacatecas, Mexican Empire
- Died: February 6, 1927 (aged 60)
- Venerated in: Catholic Church
- Beatified: November 22, 1992 by Pope John Paul II
- Canonized: May 21, 2000 by Pope John Paul II
- Feast: May 21

Mateo Correa Magallanes (July 23, 1866 – February 6, 1927) was a Mexican Catholic priest and Knight of Columbus.

Correa was born at Tepechitlán, Zacatecas, Mexico. He attended the seminary at Zacatecas on a scholarship, in 1881. He was ordained as priest in 1893 at the age of 27. As a young priest, he gave first communion to Miguel Pro who also became a priest and was later martyred. Correa was assigned as a parish priest to Concepción del Oro in 1898, and then to Colotlán in 1908. Following the government's repression of the Catholic Church in 1910, he went into hiding. He was assigned to Valparaíso in 1926.

== Martyrdom ==
In 1927, during the government's continuing persecution of the church, Correa was arrested by soldiers as he was bringing Viaticum to a woman who was an invalid. Accused of being part of the armed Cristero defense, he was jailed in Zacatecas, and then in Durango. On February 5, 1927, Correa was asked by General Eulogio Ortiz to hear the confessions of some imprisoned members of the Cristeros, an uprising of Catholic men who decided to fight back against the persecution of the church led by Mexico's president Plutarco Elias Calles. Correa agreed to administer the Sacrament of Reconciliation to these prisoners, but afterward Ortiz demanded to know what the condemned prisoners had confessed. Correa refused. Ortiz then pointed a gun at Correa's head and threatened him with immediate death. Correa continued to refuse, and at dawn on February 6, 1927, he was taken to the cemetery on the outskirts of Durango and shot through the head.

== Canonization ==
Mateo Correa Magallanes was canonized as a saint by Pope John Paul II on May 21, 2000. The canonization ceremony took place in St. Peter's Square at the Vatican and was attended by thousands of pilgrims from Mexico and other parts of the world.

In his homily, John Paul praised Saint Mateo Correa Magallanes for his heroic witness of faith and love, and for his willingness to give his life for the sake of the Gospel. He urged the faithful to follow the example of the new saints and to be witnesses of Christ in their daily lives, especially in the face of persecution and violence. Saint Mateo Correa Magallanes is remembered as a symbol of courage and fidelity to Christ, and his canonization is an important moment for the Catholic Church in Mexico and around the world.
