= Trancoso Municipality, Zacatecas =

Municipality in Mexico

Coordinates: 22°44′07″N 102°21′58″W

Trancoso
- Municipality
- Location in Mexico Trancoso (Mexico)
- Country: Mexico
- State: Zacatecas
- Demonym: (in Spanish)
- Time zone: UTC−6 (CST)

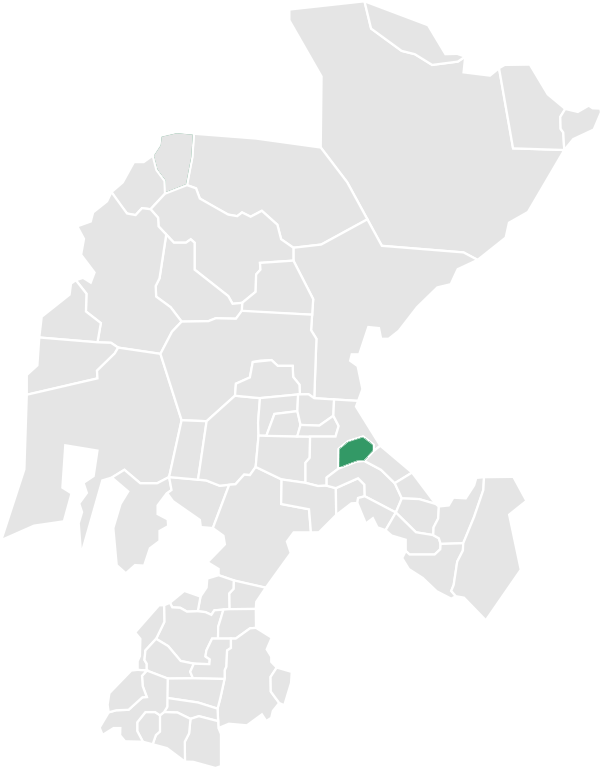
Trancoso in Zacatecas, México

Trancoso Municipality is one of the 58 municipalities of Zacatecas, Mexico.
