= Tepechitlán =

Coordinates: 21°40′N 103°20′W

- Coat of arms

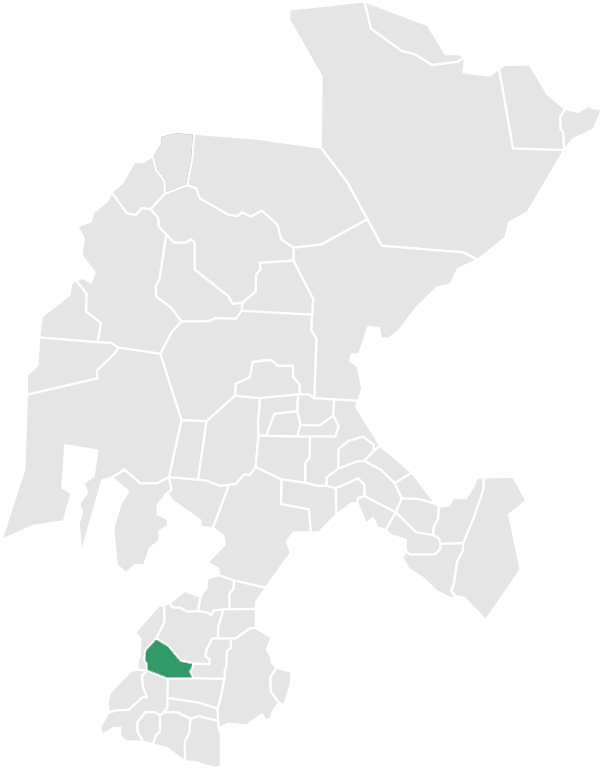
- Location within the state of Zacatecas

- Zacatecas' location within Mexico
- Country: Mexico
- State: Zacatecas
- Municipality: Tepechitlán

Government
  - Mayor: Sílvia Quiñónez

Area
  - Municipality: 584 km^{2} (225 sq mi)
- Elevation: 1,700 m (5,600 ft)

Population (2005)
  - Total: 8,972
  - Demonym: Tepechitlense (Spanish) Tepechiteca (Nahuatl)
- Time zone: UTC-6 (Central (US Central))
- Postal code: 99750,99753,99754,99760,99763,99755,99770,99773

The municipality of Tepechitlán is located in the southwestern portion of the Mexican state of Zacatecas. It is located between 21º33'49" and 21º44'00" latitude north and 103º09'07" and 103º32'01" longitude west with an average altitude of approximately 1,700 meters above sea level. The municipality covers an area of 584 square kilometers.

To the north, it is bordered by the municipality of Tlaltenango de Sánchez Román, to the south by the municipality of Teúl de González Ortega, to the east by the municipalities of Jalpa and Apozol, to the west by the municipalities of Atolinga and Florencia de Benito Juárez as well as the state of Jalisco.

== History ==
The name of the municipality of 'Tepechitlán derives from the Caxcan word "tepezil" which refers to fertility, thus the name means fertile land. Prior to the arrival of the Spanish to the area, the town and its surrounding areas were inhabited by Amerindians of the Caxcan ethnic group. The town's first mention in Spanish documents appears in 1537. The town and its inhabitants were originally put under the trusteeship or "encomienda" of Pedro de Bobadilla. The trusteeship was then transferred to his mestizo son Francisco de Bobadilla and eventually was extinguished, as were many other similar trusteeships in the area due to ongoing uprisings of the local indigenous groups and the Chichimeca War.

In the early 17th century, the town was under the jurisdiccion of neighboring Tlaltenango and was primarily inhabited by indigenous people, though a few Spanish families had begun to settle in the area with the end of the Chichimeca War.

Tepechitlán was officially recognized as a municipality in 1857.

Mateo Correa Magallanes who was canonized by Pope John Paul II was born in Tepechitlán in 1866.
