= Villa de Cos =

Villa de Cos Municipality
- Municipality
- Tropic of Cancer marker

- Location in Mexico
- Coordinates: 23°17′42″N 102°20′24″W
- Country: Mexico
- State: Zacatecas

Area
  - Total: 6,405 km^{2} (2,473 sq mi)

Population (2010)
  - Total: 34,328
  - Density: 5.360/km^{2} (13.88/sq mi)

Villa de Cos is one of the 58 municipalities of the Mexican state of Zacatecas. It is located in the center-east of the state, bordered by the municipalities of Mazapil, Francisco R. Murguia, Río Grande, Felipe Pescador, Fresnillo, Pánuco and Guadalupe in Zacatecas as well as Santo Domingo and Villa de Ramos in the neighboring state of San Luis Potosí. It has an area of 6,405 km^{2} (2,473 sq mi) occupying 8.53% of state territory. The municipal seat is located in the town of the same name. According to figures from INEGI, in 2010 it had a population of 34.328 inhabitants. Its main economic activity is picking chile and feedlot.

As of March 11, 2021, 335 cases and 45 deaths related to the COVID-19 pandemic in Mexico were reported in the municipality.

Four police officers were killed when their patrol car was blown up by a criminal gang near Chupaderos on March 12, 2021. Seven suspects were later arrested and two killed in a confrontation with the police in Tepozán.
