= Teúl de González Ortega Municipality =

Teúl
- Municipality
- Teúl de González Ortega
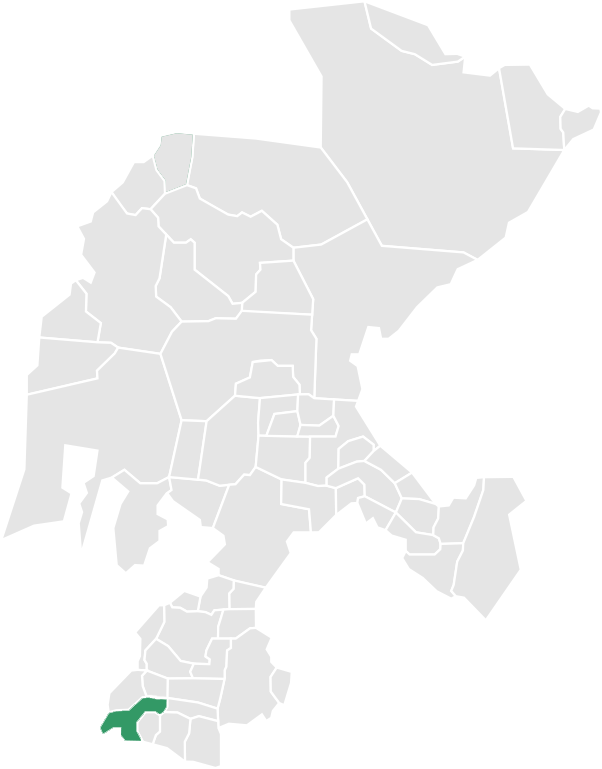
- Location of municipality
- Interactive map of Teúl
- Coordinates: 21°27′44″N 103°27′39″W
- Country: Mexico
- State: Zacatecas
- Founded: 1536 (official)

Government
  - Municipal President: Saint. José Humberto Muro Cortés
- Elevation (of seat): 1,940 m (6,360 ft)
- Time zone: UTC-6 (Central (US Central))

Teúl de González Ortega Municipality (Spanish: [teˈul de ɣonˈsales oɾˈteɣa]) is a town and municipality located in the south of the Mexican state of Zacatecas, between the state capital of Zacatecas and the city of Guadalajara. Unlike most of the rest of the state, its economy has been based on agriculture and livestock, rather than mining, and it is noted for its production of agave and mezcal. The town has been named a Pueblo Mágico to promote a tourism industry.

== Geography ==
The municipality extends over 886 km^{2} (342 sq mi), and borders the municipalities of Tepechitlán, Mezquital del Oro, Garcia de la Cadena and Florencia de Benito Juárez with the state of Jalisco to the south and the state of Nayarit to the west. Outside the seat, other important communities include Ignacio Allende with 1,800 residents, Huitzila with 800 and www.milpillas.com with 500. In addition there are sixteen other communities with representation in the municipal government.

The municipality has mountains, small mesas, plain and rolling hills with an average altitude of 1,940 meters (6,360 ft) above sea level. The Cerro de Teul is marked by a large cross.

=== Hydrography ===
The area is part of the Lerma River basin. The municipal seat is at the juncture of two small rivers called the Rio Grande and La Aticuata. Together they form the Tlaltenango River. After joining other rivers to the Lerma, the area drains into the Pacific. Another important river in the area is the Patitos. The municipality contains one dam called the Manuel Caloca with a capacity of 5,000,000 m^{3} (180,000,000 cu ft) and another called the Ignacio Allende with a capacity of 1,000,000 m^{3} (35,000,000 cu ft). The rest of the municipality has an abundance of fresh water springs which provide most of the potable water.

=== Climate ===
The climate is between semi warm and temperate with an average annual precipitation of between 750 and 800 mm (30 and 31 in) with most rain falling in the summer, especially July. The north is drier than the south. The coldest months are December and January with lows down to 11 °C (52 °F) with occasional freezing. The warmest months are May and June with highs up to 40 °C (104 °F).

=== Flora and fauna ===
Much of the area is forested with species such as oak, holm oak, royal pine and “palo colorado”. Fauna includes coyotes, wildcats, white-tailed deer, squirrels, rabbits, various spiders and scorpions, rattlesnakes, coral snakes, and other snakes, eagles, quail, owls, storks, ducks and various other birds.

== History ==
The name Teúl comes from the Chichimeca phrase teulinchan, which means “dwellings of the gods.” After the Conquest, its name became San Juan Bautista de Teúl, prepending the name of its patron saint. In 1935, the suffix of “de Gonzaléz Ortega” was added. Jesús González Ortega, a governor of Zacatecas and ally of Benito Juárez, lived in the town as a boy, then returned later in life to marry.

Little is known of the early inhabitants of the area, but settlements probably go back as far as the first century of the Common Era, according to archeological evidence such as tombs. The Caxcans arrived here around the middle of the 7th century, taking control of the valley from the Nahuas and the Techueshes. They remained the dominant group until the arrival of the Spanish.

In 1536 Nuño de Guzmán sent Pedro Almíndez Chirino to the area then followed himself shortly after. Within months the indigenous of the area were conquered and Captain Juan Delgado along with Frair Juan Pacheco founded the modern town. At that pre-Hispanic ceremonial center the friar held a mass in honor of John the Baptist, who became the town’s patron saint. One probable reason for the selection of this saint by the Spanish was the area’s abundance of fresh water springs. At this mass, they baptized the area chieftain and a sister, giving them the names of Juan and Catalina. In 1574, a monastery was founded here.

Unlike other small towns in Zacatecas, it was never a mining town, with its economy based on livestock and the making of mezcal from agave. During the colonial period into the 19th century, much of the agriculture was organized into haciendas, but these were dismantled with the Mexican Revolution and the Cristero War, when the town itself was nearly burnt to the ground.

The Sanctuary of Our Lady of Guadalupe was the original parish church constructed in the late 17th century.

The town was formally recognized in 1714 by the Real Audiencia de la Nueva Galicia.

At the time of Independence, Teul was a dependency of Tlaltenango, but was separated into its own municipality in 1844. This status was reaffirmed in 1935.

In 1986, the municipality adopted a seal on the occasion of the 450th anniversary of the town’s founding.

== Socioeconomics and culture ==
The economy of the municipality is based on agriculture and livestock. Eighty eight percent of the farmland is worked only during the rainy season, with the rest irrigated. The main crop is corn, followed by beans then sorghum and fava beans. Livestock is mostly cattle followed by pigs.

Another important crop is agave, which is used to make mezcal. This liquor is still made by hand, using wood barrels and pits to roast the agave hearts. The municipality has seven registered distilleries making mezcal including El Caxcán, Don Aurelio Lamas and Zacatecano. In addition to the straight mezcal, cream variations in flavors such as strawberry, piña colada, coconut, nut and coffee are produced.

The area remains relatively poor, with many families having one or more members living in the United States to work. The state and municipality have worked to develop a tourism industry for Teúl as well, including its naming as a Pueblo Mágico.

This rural area maintains many of its traditional religious and secular celebrations, mostly related to local saints. Unlike many places in Mexico, the streets are clear of street vendors, so street food is generally available only during festivals. Local specialties include gordita de horno, a sweet case baked on an oak leaf, and gorditas de arriero, a savory dish filled with refried beans flavored with chile de arbol. Other popular dishes include pipian rojo, tamales with meat and nopal, tortitas de guachal (made with nopales and eggs), and chuales, a kind of baked tamale with beans and piloncillo and birria.

Handcrafts include wooden masks, most often used for a traditional dance called Los Morenos in honor of the Holy Cross. Another craft is ceramics, which include pots, plates, storage jars and ladles. They are made with a sand colored clay and glazed.
