= Atolinga Municipality =

Municipality in the Mexican state of Zacatecas

Atolinga
- Municipality
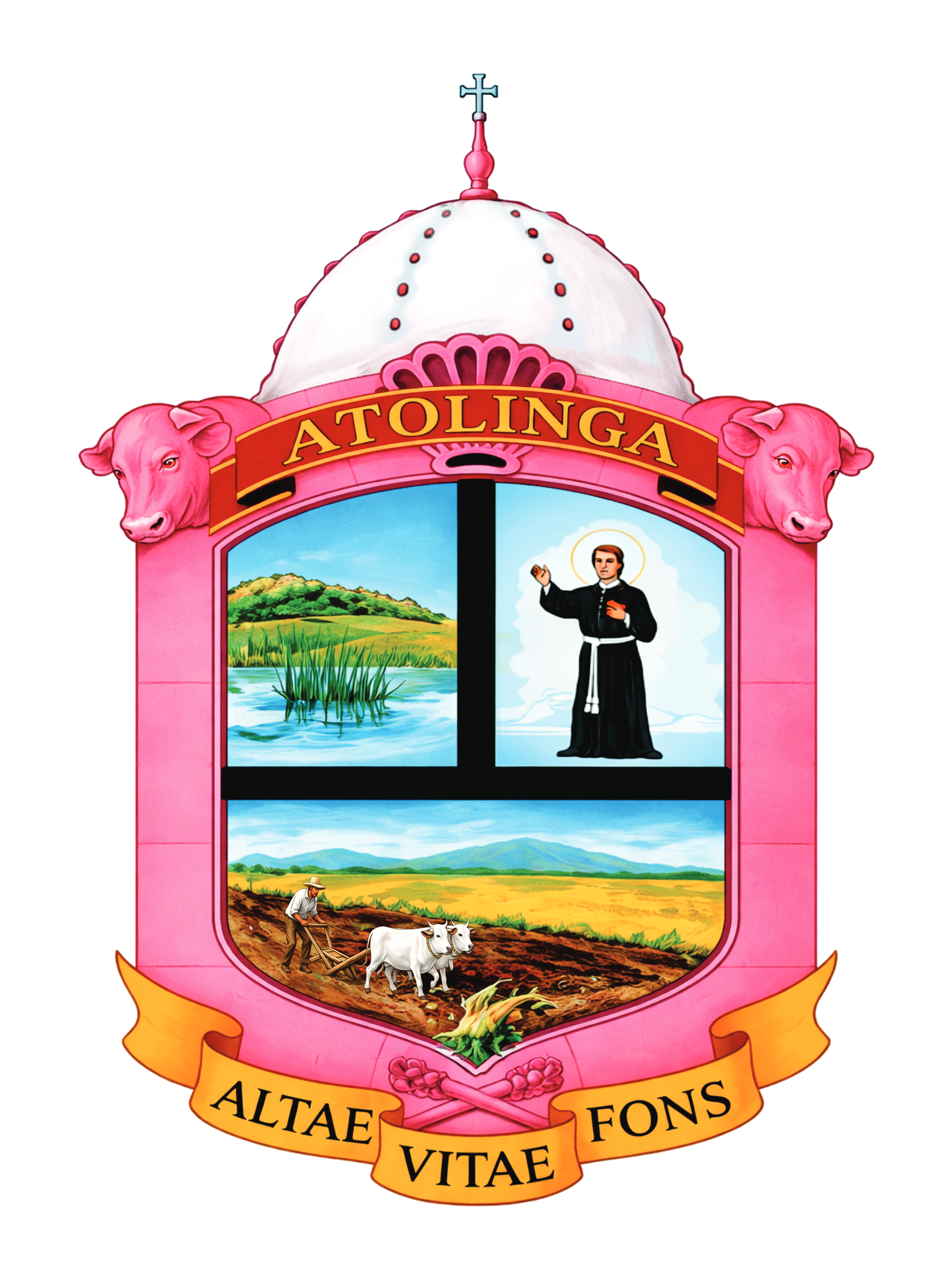
- Coat of arms
- Nickname: Agualinda
- Motto: Altae Vitae Fons (Fountain of High Life)
- Location within Zacatecas Location within Mexico
- Coordinates: 21°44′15″N 103°28′30″W
- Country: Mexico
- State: Zacatecas
- Municipal seat: Atolinga
- Largest city: Atolinga
- Municipality: 1917

Government
  - Municipal President: Teresita de Jesús Arteaga Pérez

Area
  - Total: 280 km^{2} (110 sq mi)
- Elevation: 2,250 m (7,380 ft)

Population (2005)
  - Total: 2,738
  - Largest city: 1,465 Atolinga
- Time zone: UTC-6 (Central (US Central))
- Postal Code: 99730
- Area code: 437

Atolinga is one of the 58 municipalities in the state of Zacatecas, Mexico. It is located on the southern part of the state of Zacatecas and is bordered by the municipalities of Tepechitlán and Florencia de Benito Juárez. To the east it is bordered by Tlaltenango de Sánchez Román and to the north and west by the state of Jalisco. The municipality covers a total surface area of 280 square kilometers (110 sq mi). The municipal seat of Atolinga is located at 21° 44’ 15” north and 103° 28’ 30” west. The town is located at 2,250 meters (7,380 ft) above sea level.

== History ==
Before the arrival of the Spanish to the area, the region around Atolinga was inhabited by indigenous people of the Caxcan and Tepecan ethnic groups. The first Spanish contact with these people must have been in 1530 when Pedro Almíndez Chirino went through the Valley of Tlaltenango on a northbound expedition.

The first land grantee of the area was Pedro Sernosa, who later sold his land to Juan Fernández de Jara Quemada.

The town formed part of the jurisdiction of Tlaltenango for both ecclesiastical purposes and governmental purposes until the beginning of the 1800s. In 1814, a plea was made by the citizenry that the community be granted its own town council and status as a municipality due to the long distance from the municipal seat and the ascending local population. The plea spells out that the town counted with nearly 700 "souls" and that within a radius of two leagues lived more than 3,700 people.

Most of this towns families are large families with the same last name. The most common are : Carlos, Bugarín, Castañeda, Delgado, Saldana, Nanes and Salinas.

In recent decades, Atolinga's population has decreased due to emigration. Migrants from Atolinga can be found throughout the United States, especially in Chicago, Indianapolis, Atlanta, and the San Gabriel Valley region of California. Journalist Sam Quinones has written about such migrants in his book Antonio's Gun and Delfino's Dream: True Tales of Mexican Migration.

== Population ==
In the 2005 census Atolinga, reported a population of 2,738. Of these, 1,453 lived in the municipal seat and the remainder lived in surrounding rural communities.
