= Río Grande Municipality, Zacatecas =

Río Grande
- Municipality
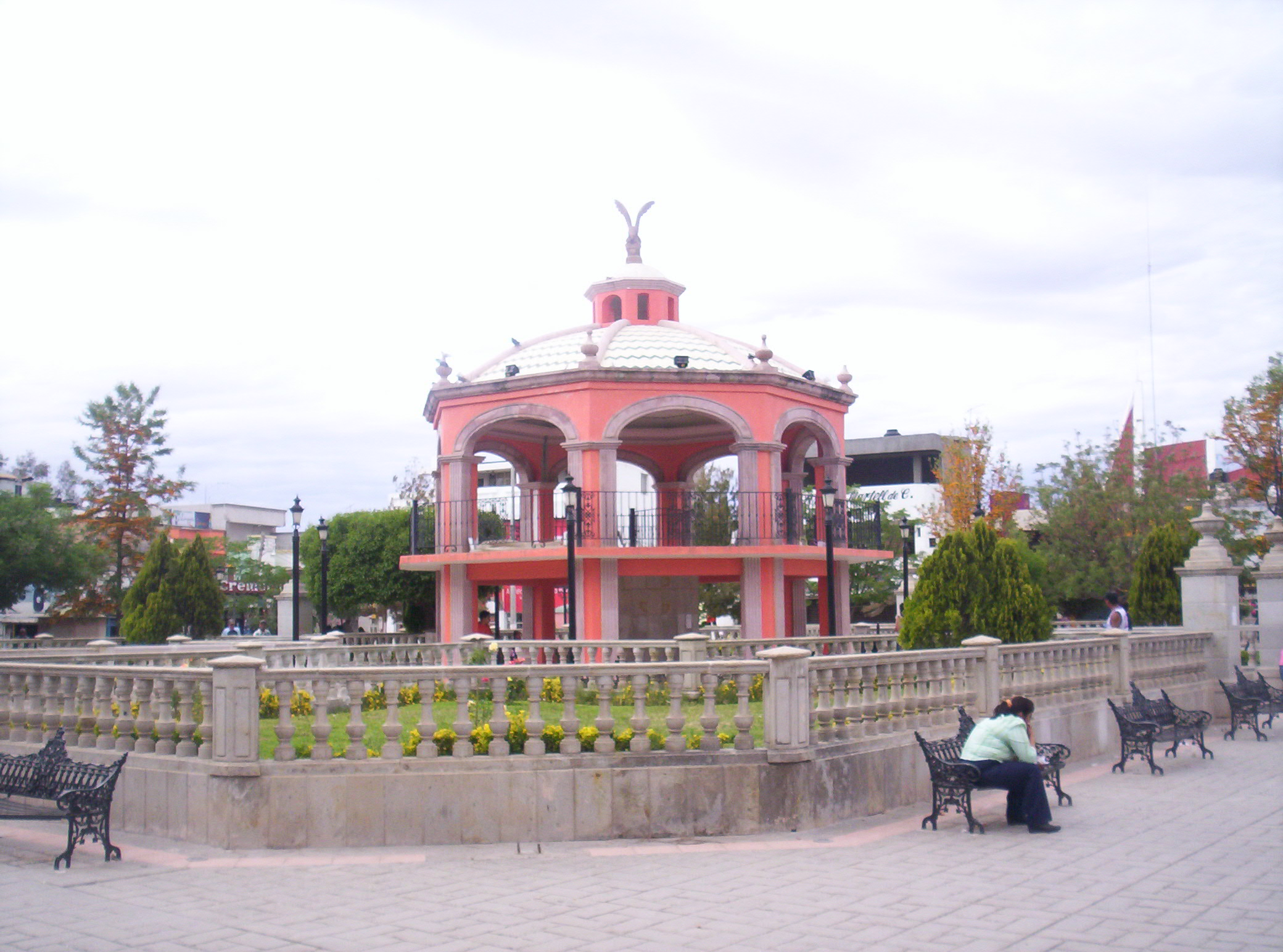
- Main plaza of the town of Río Grande

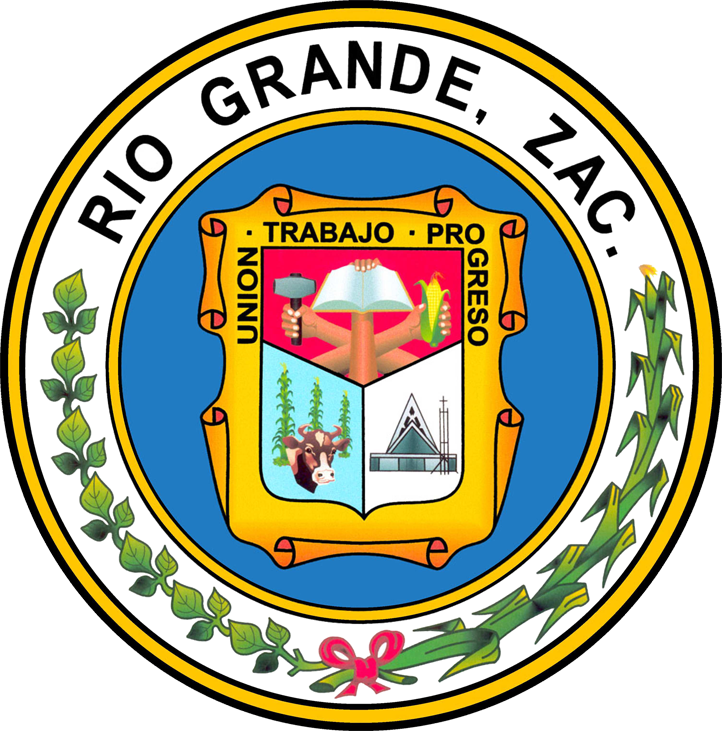
- Coat of arms
- Motto: Unión, trabajo y progreso (Union, work and progress)
- Location in Zacatecas

- Location in Mexico
- Coordinates: 23°49′21″N 103°02′11″W
- Country: Mexico
- State: Zacatecas
- Established: 29 October 1833
- Seat: Río Grande

Government
  - President: Julio César Ramírez López

Area
  - Total: 1,842.931 km^{2} (711.560 sq mi)
- Elevation (of seat): 1,857 m (6,093 ft)
- Highest elevation (Cerro Tetilla Grande): 2,370 m (7,780 ft)

Population (2010 Census)
  - Total: 62,693
  - Estimate (2015 Intercensal Survey): 63,880
  - Density: 34.018/km^{2} (88.106/sq mi)
  - Seat: 32,944
- Time zone: UTC-6 (Central)
- Postal codes: 98400–98429
- Area code: 498
- Website: Official website

Río Grande is a municipality in the Mexican state of Zacatecas.

== Geography ==
The municipality of Río Grande is located in northern Zacatecas. It borders the municipalities of Miguel Auza, Juan Aldama, and General Francisco R. Murguía to the north, Villa de Cos to the east, Cañitas de Felipe Pescador to the southeast, Fresnillo and Saín Alto to the south, and Sombrerete to the west. It covers an area of 1,842.931 square kilometres (711.560 sq mi) and comprises 2.4% of the state's area.

Over 96% of the municipality's area lies in the drainage basin of the Aguanaval River, the main watercourse in the area which flows south to north through the municipality. This river was known as the Río Grande in the 16th and 17th centuries despite its modest size. The highest point in the municipality is the Cerro Tetilla Grande located at 23°41′N 102°51′W with an elevation of 2,370 metres (7,780 ft) above sea level.

Río Grande's climate is semiarid temperate with an average annual temperature of 19 °C (66 °F). Average annual precipitation ranges between 300 and 600 millimetres.

Climate data for Río Grande weather station at 23°49′01″N 103°01′33″W, 1902 m above sea level (1981–2010 averages)
Month	Jan	Feb	Mar	Apr	May	Jun	Jul	Aug	Sep	Oct	Nov	Dec	Year
Record high °C (°F)	28.5 (83.3)	30.0 (86.0)	33.5 (92.3)	36.0 (96.8)	37.0 (98.6)	37.0 (98.6)	34.0 (93.2)	34.0 (93.2)	32.5 (90.5)	31.0 (87.8)	31.5 (88.7)	30.0 (86.0)	37.0 (98.6)
Mean daily maximum °C (°F)	20.4 (68.7)	22.5 (72.5)	26.0 (78.8)	29.0 (84.2)	31.0 (87.8)	30.0 (86.0)	28.0 (82.4)	27.6 (81.7)	25.8 (78.4)	24.8 (76.6)	22.9 (73.2)	20.9 (69.6)	25.7 (78.3)
Daily mean °C (°F)	10.6 (51.1)	12.5 (54.5)	15.3 (59.5)	18.3 (64.9)	21.1 (70.0)	21.8 (71.2)	20.8 (69.4)	20.3 (68.5)	19.0 (66.2)	16.6 (61.9)	13.3 (55.9)	11.2 (52.2)	16.7 (62.1)
Mean daily minimum °C (°F)	0.7 (33.3)	2.4 (36.3)	4.7 (40.5)	7.6 (45.7)	11.2 (52.2)	13.5 (56.3)	13.6 (56.5)	13.1 (55.6)	12.1 (53.8)	8.5 (47.3)	3.7 (38.7)	1.5 (34.7)	7.7 (45.9)
Record low °C (°F)	−10.0 (14.0)	−5.5 (22.1)	−5.0 (23.0)	−1.0 (30.2)	3.0 (37.4)	6.0 (42.8)	3.0 (37.4)	8.0 (46.4)	4.0 (39.2)	−2.0 (28.4)	−5.0 (23.0)	−11.0 (12.2)	−11.0 (12.2)
Average precipitation mm (inches)	15.0 (0.59)	9.1 (0.36)	2.0 (0.08)	4.9 (0.19)	14.1 (0.56)	68.3 (2.69)	61.4 (2.42)	78.1 (3.07)	69.2 (2.72)	40.0 (1.57)	12.8 (0.50)	8.9 (0.35)	383.8 (15.11)
Average precipitation days (≥ 0.1 mm)	2.6	1.4	0.7	1.2	3.1	8.5	9.8	12.1	9.9	4.8	2.5	2.3	58.9
Source: Servicio Meteorológico Nacional

== History ==
Prior to the arrival of the Spanish, the Río Grande area was inhabited by Chichimeca peoples such as the Guachichil and Irritila. Oral history holds that a Spanish settlement was founded at Río Grande on 18 August 1562. The town was recognized by the Royal Audiencia of Guadalajara on March 5, 1689 under the name Santa Elena de Río Grande.

Río Grande was first incorporated as an ayuntamiento in the partido of Nieves in Zacatecas on 29 October 1833. It became a free municipality on 19 August 1916.

== Administration ==
The municipal government comprises a president, a councillor (Spanish: síndico), and fourteen trustees (regidores), eight elected by relative majority and six by proportional representation. The current president of the municipality is Mario Cordova Longoria.

== Demographics ==
In the 2010 Mexican Census, the municipality of Río Grande recorded a population of 62,693 inhabitants living in 15,628 households. It recorded a population of 63,880 inhabitants in the 2015 Intercensal Survey.

There are 58 localities in the municipality, two of which are classified as urban:

- Río Grande, the municipal seat located on the Aguanaval River, which recorded a population of 32,944 inhabitants in the 2010 Census; and
- Loreto, a suburb of the municipal seat located to its northeast, which had 2637 inhabitants in 2010.

== Economy ==
The main economic activity in Río Grande is agriculture. Beans are its main crop; the municipality is located in the middle of Mexico's main bean-producing region. The gross domestic product of the municipality was unofficially estimated at 2655.8 million Mexican pesos in 2010.
