= Cañitas de Felipe Pescador Municipality =

Municipality of Cañitas de Felipe Pescador
- Municipality
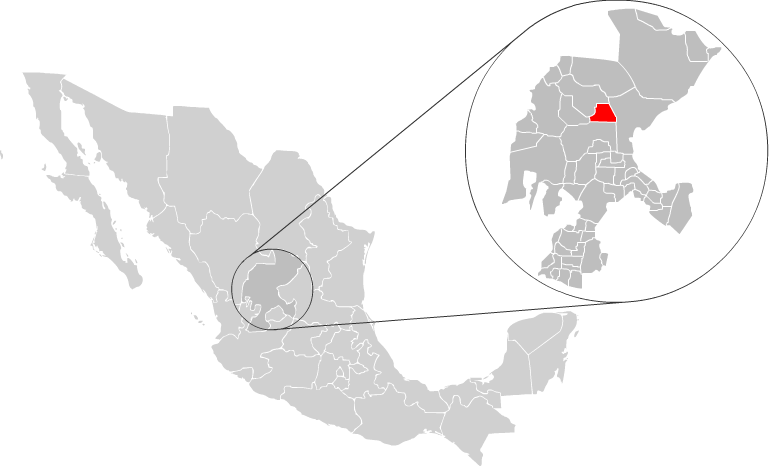
- Location of Cañitas de Felipe Pescador within Zacatecas and Mexico
- Coordinates: 24°15′N 102°30′W
- Country: Mexico
- State: Zacatecas
- Municipal seat: Cañitas de Felipe Pescador
- Largest city: Cañitas de Felipe Pescador
- Founded: 1921 (Donato Moreno)
- Municipality: November 19, 1958

Government
  - Municipal President: Rogelio Monreal Durón, PRD

Area
  - Total: 482 km^{2} (186 sq mi)
- Elevation: 2,020 m (6,630 ft)

Population (2005)
  - Total: 7,893
  - Largest city: 5,950 Cañitas de Felipe Pescador
- Time zone: UTC-6 (Central (US Central))
- Postal Code: 98480, 98490
- Area code: 458

Cañitas de Felipe Pescador is one of the 58 municipalities in the state of Zacatecas, Mexico. It is located in the northern part of Zacatecas and is bounded by the municipalities of Río Grande, Villa de Cos, and Fresnillo. The municipality covers a total surface area of 482 square kilometres (186 sq mi).

The municipal seat is also called Cañitas de Felipe Pescador.

== History ==
The first inhabitants of the Cañitas de Felipe Pescador region were the Huichol. In 1918, the region became populated with farmers. In 1921, governor Donato Moreno granted a motion to legally fund the Cañitas region with the expropriation of haciendas as an ejido, a system of communal land. This led to the rise of the region to become an Independent Congregation of the Municipality of Fresnillo.

In 1921, the first school was founded with the name of Carlos A. Carrillo, which placed special attention to environmental education. That same year the train station was installed in the city of Cañitas, and the community of La Colorada was moved to the region.

It was not until November 19, 1958, that Cañitas went from being a Congregation to a Municipality. Gilberto Montes Monsiváis was named Municipal president, and that same year elections are held in which Herón Domínguez was declared the winner, and he became the first elected municipal president of Cañitas de Felipe Pescador (1959–1961).

== Population ==
In the 2005 census, Cañitas de Felipe Pescador reported a population of 7,893. Of these, 5,950 lived in the municipal seat, and the remainder lived in surrounding rural communities.

=== Religion ===
Most of the population (93.83%) is Catholic; Protestants and Evangelicals follow with 2.87%, and the remainder are Seventh-day Adventists and Neo-Pentecostals with 6.17%.

== Towns and Villages ==
- Cañitas de Felipe Pescador
- Boquilla de Abajo
- Los Caballos
- Cañitas Viejo (Cañitas Viejas)
- La Quemada
- San Francisco
- El Saucillo
- El Porvenir
- Potrero de Badillo (Badillo)
- Enrique Estrada
