= Vetagrande =

Vetagrande Municipality
- Municipality
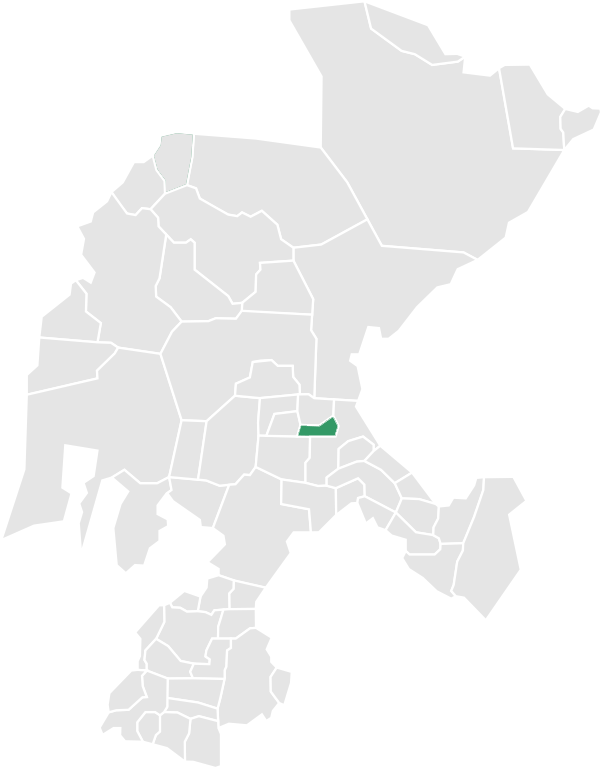
- Municipality of Vetagrande

- Location in Mexico
- Coordinates: 22°49′00″N 102°57′33″W
- Country: Mexico
- State: Zacatecas

Area
  - Total: 142 km^{2} (55 sq mi)

Population
  - Total: 8,358

Vetagrande Municipality is one of the 58 municipalities in the Mexican state of Zacatecas. It has an area of 142 km^{2} (55 sq mi) occupying 0.18% of state territory. The municipal seat is located in the town of the same name. Another town of this municipality is Llano de las Vírgenes.
