= Moyahua de Estrada =

Coordinates: 21.0000°N 103.0000°W

- Municipality
- Location in Mexico Moyahua de Estrada (Mexico)
- Country: Mexico
- State: Zacatecas
- Demonym: (in Spanish)
- Time zone: UTC−6 (CST)

Moyahua de Estrada is a municipality in the Mexican state of Zacatecas at the border with the state of Jalisco.

As of 2020, the municipality had a population of 4,530 people. More than 2000 people from Moyahua live in the United States, most of them in California (Northern California). Moyahua is surrounded by Juchipila, Santa Rosa, Cuxpala, and Mezquital del Oro in Zacatecas and by Ixtlahuacán del Río and Cuquío in Jalisco Municipalities.

The town's church is centered on Apostol Santo Santiago, celebrating on July 24, 25, and 26. The 25th being the main day when about 10,000 people visit every year.

It is also known for its distinct town square that is closed off with four main entry points, one of three in the entire country.
