= Mazapil Municipality =

Mazapil
- Municipality
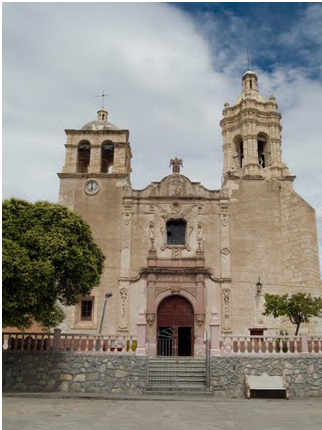
- Church in Mazapil

- Location in Zacatecas

- Location in Mexico
- Coordinates: 24°38′18″N 101°33′19″W
- Country: Mexico
- State: Zacatecas
- Established: 17 January 1825
- Seat: Mazapil

Government
  - President: Gregorio Macías Zúñiga

Area
  - Total: 12,143.256 km^{2} (4,688.537 sq mi)
- Elevation (of seat): 2,268 m (7,441 ft)

Population (2020 Census)
  - Total: 17,813
  - Estimate (2015 Intercensal Survey): 17,774
  - Density: 1.4669/km^{2} (3.7993/sq mi)
  - Seat: 794
- Time zone: UTC-6 (Central)
- Postal codes: 98230–98287
- Area code: 842
- Website: Official website

Mazapil is a municipality in the Mexican state of Zacatecas and the state's largest municipality by area. The Peñasquito mine, Mexico's largest gold mine, is located in this sparsely populated municipality.

== Geography ==
The municipality of Mazapil is located in northern Zacatecas where it borders three other Mexican states. The Zacatecan municipalities it borders are Melchor Ocampo to the north, General Francisco R. Murguía to the west, Villa de Cos to the south and Concepción del Oro to the east. Mazapil also borders the municipalities of Catorce, Santo Domingo and Vanegas, to the east, all part of San Luis Potosí; San Juan de Guadalupe in the state of Durango to the west; and Saltillo and Viesca to the north, both in Coahuila. Mazapil is Zacatecas's largest and Mexico's twelfth largest municipality, covering an area of 12,143.256 square kilometres (4,688.537 sq mi) and comprising 16.1% of the state's area.

Mazapil is situated in the Chihuahuan Desert and has an elevation range between 1,300 and 3,200 metres (4,300–10,500 ft). Matorral vegetation predominates in the mostly arid and semi-arid climate, although open pinyon-juniper woodlands occur in the more elevated regions with their more temperate and partially sub-humid climates. Average annual precipitation in the municipality varies between 200 and 600 millimetres (7.9–23.6 in).

Climate data for Mazapil weather station at 24°38′26″N 101°33′21″W, 2474 m above sea level (1981–2010 averages)
| Month | Jan | Feb | Mar | Apr | May | Jun | Jul | Aug | Sep | Oct | Nov | Dec | Year |
|---|---|---|---|---|---|---|---|---|---|---|---|---|---|
| Record high °C (°F) | 29.0 (84.2) | 32.0 (89.6) | 32.0 (89.6) | 35.0 (95.0) | 40.0 (104.0) | 42.0 (107.6) | 36.0 (96.8) | 37.0 (98.6) | 35.0 (95.0) | 32.0 (89.6) | 34.0 (93.2) | 29.0 (84.2) | 42.0 (107.6) |
| Mean daily maximum °C (°F) | 16.3 (61.3) | 18.2 (64.8) | 21.2 (70.2) | 24.3 (75.7) | 27.1 (80.8) | 27.9 (82.2) | 26.5 (79.7) | 26.1 (79.0) | 24.4 (75.9) | 23.2 (73.8) | 20.5 (68.9) | 17.2 (63.0) | 22.7 (72.9) |
| Daily mean °C (°F) | 9.3 (48.7) | 10.8 (51.4) | 13.5 (56.3) | 16.4 (61.5) | 19.2 (66.6) | 20.4 (68.7) | 19.4 (66.9) | 19.1 (66.4) | 17.8 (64.0) | 16.2 (61.2) | 13.4 (56.1) | 10.4 (50.7) | 15.5 (59.9) |
| Mean daily minimum °C (°F) | 2.4 (36.3) | 3.5 (38.3) | 5.8 (42.4) | 8.5 (47.3) | 11.4 (52.5) | 12.8 (55.0) | 12.4 (54.3) | 12.2 (54.0) | 11.1 (52.0) | 9.2 (48.6) | 6.2 (43.2) | 3.6 (38.5) | 8.3 (46.9) |
| Record low °C (°F) | −6.0 (21.2) | −6.0 (21.2) | −5.0 (23.0) | −3.0 (26.6) | 2.0 (35.6) | 5.0 (41.0) | 6.0 (42.8) | 3.0 (37.4) | 2.0 (35.6) | −3.0 (26.6) | −6.0 (21.2) | −12.0 (10.4) | −12.0 (10.4) |
| Average precipitation mm (inches) | 26.0 (1.02) | 14.0 (0.55) | 6.2 (0.24) | 19.1 (0.75) | 40.7 (1.60) | 58.2 (2.29) | 69.8 (2.75) | 72.6 (2.86) | 73.3 (2.89) | 39.9 (1.57) | 16.4 (0.65) | 17.5 (0.69) | 453.7 (17.86) |
| Average precipitation days (≥ 0.1 mm) | 2.4 | 1.5 | 0.9 | 1.8 | 4.1 | 5.7 | 5.6 | 6.5 | 6.3 | 3.7 | 1.7 | 2.0 | 42.2 |
Source: Servicio Meteorológico Nacional

== History ==
Mazapil's name derives from the Nahuatl place name Mazatlpilli, itself derived from mazatl "deer" and pilli "small".

The original inhabitants of the Mazapil valley were nomadic Chichimeca peoples known to the Spaniards as Guachichiles. Francisco de Ibarra reached the area in 1554. In 1562, Pedro de Ahumada y Samano reported finding the valley inhabited by 6000 native warriors armed with bows and arrows. Silver mines were first established in the valley in the late 1560s.

Mazapil was one of Zacatecas's eleven original subdivisions (then known as partidos) when the state's constitution was enacted in 1825. In 1885 the fall of a meteorite in the area during the Andromedids meteor shower attracted scientific attention, although a cometary origin for the meteorite is now considered unlikely and the timing of its fall has been ascribed to coincidence.

In 1907 Gustavo A. Madero set up four factories in the municipality for the extraction of guayule rubber. Guayule from the Mazapil region was also exported to the US for rubber production during World War II.

== Administration ==
Mazapil's municipal government comprises a president, secretary, councillor (Spanish: síndico), and six trustees (regidores). The current president of the municipality is Gregorio Macías Zúñiga.

== Demographics ==
In the 2010 Mexican Census, the municipality of Mazapil recorded a population of 17,813 inhabitants living in 4275 households. It recorded a population of 17,457 inhabitants in the 2015 Intercensal Survey.

There are 175 localities in the municipality, of which only the municipal seat, also called Mazapil, is classified as urban. Located in the northeast corner of the municipality, it recorded a population of 794 inhabitants in the 2010 Census.

== Economy ==
The main economic activities in Mazapil are mining and agriculture.

In 2015, the municipality produced 28,543 kilograms (917,700 ozt) of gold, 942,002 kilograms (30,286,100 ozt) of silver, 15,563 tonnes of copper, 85,334 tonnes of lead and 207,844 tonnes of zinc. Goldcorp's Peñasquito gold mine, Mexico's largest, is located in Mazapil. Local communities have protested the mine's activities, citing water overuse and contamination, creation of health problems for locals, and inadequate compensation for workers and landowners.

The main crops in Mazapil are corn and beans. Ixtle fiber and candelilla wax are also produced.
