= El Plateado de Joaquín Amaro =

Coordinates: 21°56′N 103°06′W

- Municipality
- Location in Mexico El Plateado de Joaquín Amaro (Mexico)
- Country: Mexico
- State: Zacatecas
- Demonym: (in Spanish)
- Time zone: UTC−6 (CST)

El Plateado de Joaquín Amaro or Joaquín Amaro, also known as El Plateado and as General Joaquín Amaro, is a municipality and community in Zacatecas, Mexico, located 105 km (65 mi) SW of Zacatecas City. It is bordered by the municipal divisions of Villanueva, Tabasco, Momax, and Tlaltenango de Sánchez Román.

- Population (1990): 1606.
- Elevation: 2,800 m (9,200 ft).
