= Benito Juárez Municipality, Zacatecas =

Coordinates: 23°51′50″N 103°23′19″W

Benito Juárez Florencia de Benito Juárez
- Nickname: Florencia
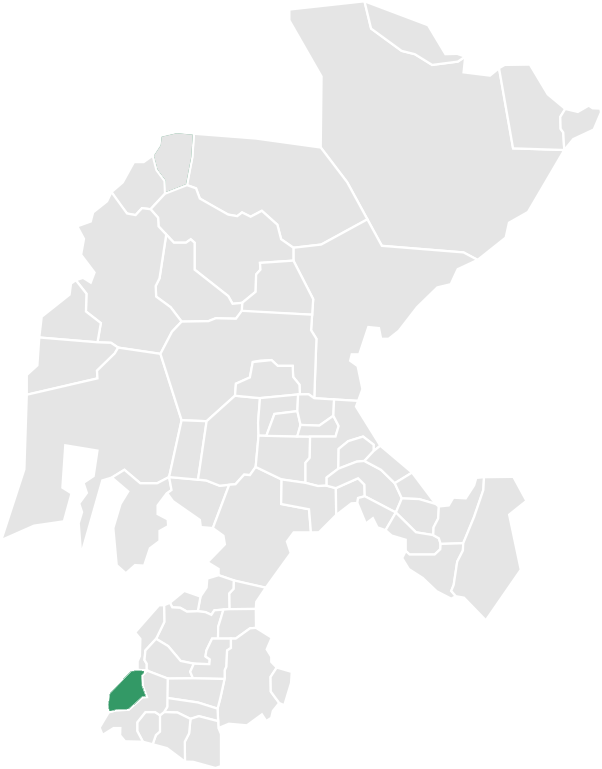
- Location within the state of Zacatecas

- Zacatecas' location within Mexico
- Country: Mexico
- State: Zacatecas
- Municipal seat: Florencia
- Elevation: 2,200 m (7,200 ft)

Population (2020)
  - Total: 4,493
- Time zone: UTC-6 (Central)
- Postal code: 99780, 99781
- Website: Official website

Benito Juárez is a municipality located on the edge of the Canyon of Tlaltenango in the southern extreme of the Mexican state of Zacatecas. The municipal seat is the town of Florencia.

== Geography ==
The municipality borders the municipalities of Tepechitlán, and Chimaltitan, Jalisco, to the north, Teúl de González Ortega and Tequila, Jalisco, to the south, Teúl de González Ortega, and Santa María de la Paz, to the east and the San Martín de Bolaños, Jalisco, to the west.

The municipality covers an area of 329 km^{2} (127 sq mi). Its rural communities include El Durazno, Tonilco, Mesa de Núñez, Llano Grande, Los Campos, San Lucas, Potrerillos, Los Sauces, Mesa de Rayos, Tecolotes, Cuevas Chicas, Mesa de Arellanos y Las Cruces.

== History ==
The municipality was formed in 1962 when it was separated from Teúl de González Ortega. It was originally inhabited by the Caxcan people. During the 18th century, Spanish settlers started to settle the area. Florencia was a staunch Catholic town during the Cristero rebellion in the 1920s and '30s.

== Economy ==
The primary economic activity is cattle ranching. The municipality has experienced a drain of population as a result of emigration to bigger cities as well as to the United States.

== Culture ==
The town celebrates its patron saint's day on December 8 in honor of the Immaculate Conception of the Virgin Mary. another important holiday is in August to celebrate its emigrant community abroad.

Some typical dishes include: pipian, a type of mole made with pumpkin seeds; gorditas de horno, a type of bread made of corn flour and milk curd. The typical wedding dish is birria with rice and beans. Tequila is the most popular as the town is close to the agave cultivation area.

== Population ==
In 2010, the municipality had a total of 4,854 inhabitants, of which 2,406 lived in the municipal seat.

== External links and sources ==
- Municipio de Benito juarez
- Mexico's Instituto Nacional de Estadística Geografía e Informática
- Mexican postal service
- state of Zacatecas(official) municipal(county) map
