= General Francisco R. Murguía Municipality =

General Francisco R. Murguía
- Municipality
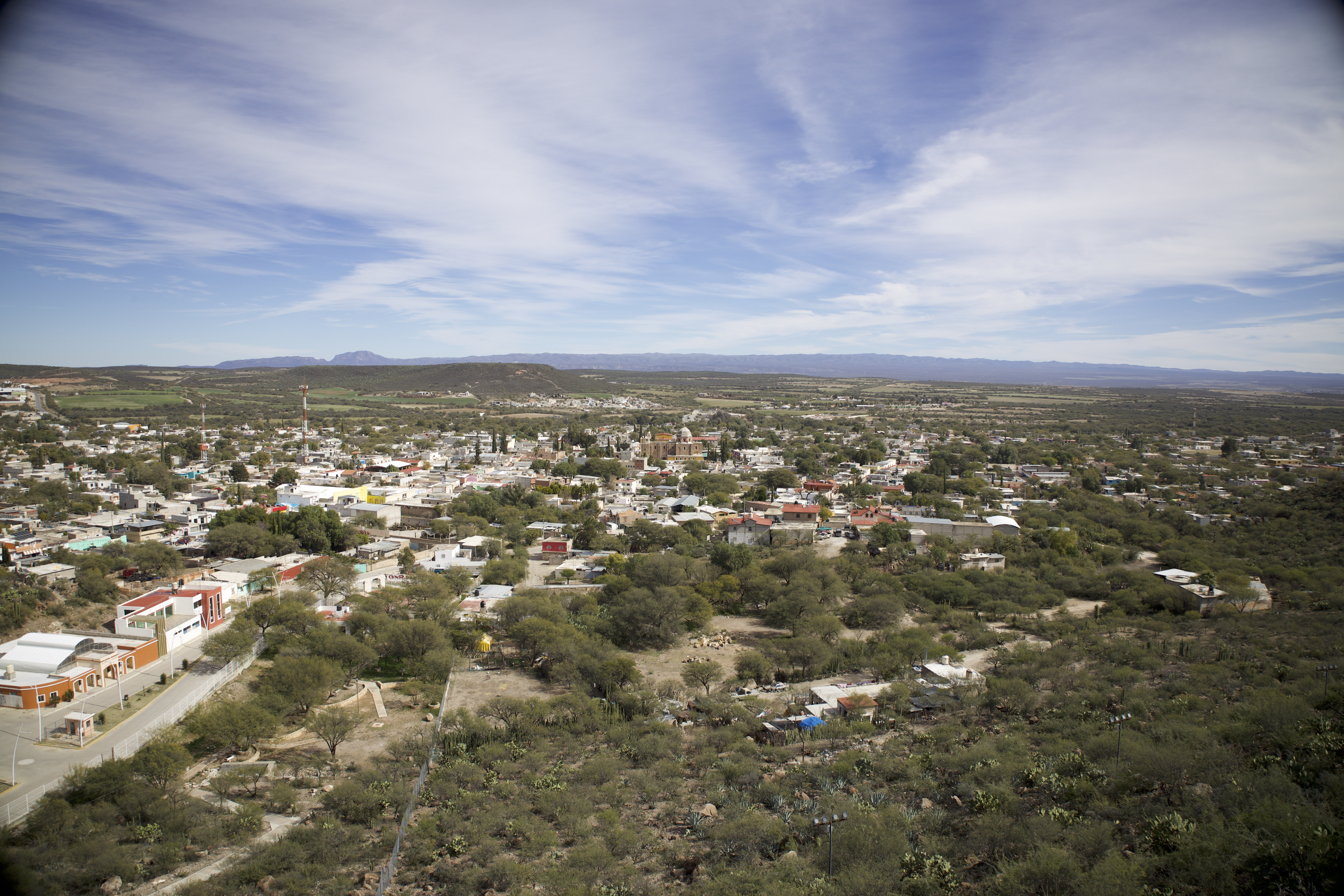
- View of Nieves

- Location of General Francisco R. Murguía in Zacatecas

- Location of General Francisco R. Murguía in Mexico
- Coordinates: 23°59′38″N 103°01′10″W
- Country: Mexico
- State: Zacatecas
- Established: 17 January 1825
- Seat: Nieves

Government
  - President: Javier García

Area
  - Total: 5,034.261 km^{2} (1,943.739 sq mi)
- Elevation (of seat): 1,910 m (6,270 ft)

Population (2010 Census)
  - Total: 21,974
  - Estimate (2015 Intercensal Survey): 21,809
  - Density: 4.3649/km^{2} (11.305/sq mi)
  - Seat: 5,653
- Time zone: UTC-6 (Central)
- Postal codes: 98350–98390
- Area code: 498
- Website: Official website

General Francisco R. Murguía is a municipality in the Mexican state of Zacatecas, located approximately 140 kilometres (87 mi) north of the state capital of Zacatecas City. Its municipal seat is located in Nieves.

== Geography ==
The municipality of Francisco R. Murguía is located at an elevation between 1,500 and 2,700 metres (4,900–8,900 ft) on the Mexican Plateau in northern Zacatecas. It borders the Zacatecan municipalities of Mazapil to the northeast, Villa de Cos to the southeast, Río Grande to the southwest, and Juan Aldama to the west. It also borders three municipalities of Durango to the north and northwest: Santa Clara, General Simón Bolívar, and San Juan de Guadalupe. The municipality covers an area of 5,034.261 square kilometres (1,943.739 sq mi) and comprises 6.6% of the state's area.

As of 2009, the land cover in Francisco R. Murguía comprises matorral (53%), grassland (24%), and mezquital (2%). Another 21% of the land is used for agriculture. The municipality lies in the endorheic basin of the Aguanaval River, which flows south to north through the municipality. The small mountain range called the Sierra de Guadalupe rises in the south-central part of the municipality, and was formerly exploited for its deposits of copper, antimony and mercury.

=== Climate ===
Francisco R. Murguía has a semi-arid climate with dry winters. Average temperatures in the municipality range between 12 and 20 °C (54–68 °F), and average annual precipitation ranges between 200 and 500 millimetres (7.9–19.7 in).

Climate data for Nieves weather station at 24°00′05″N 103°01′10″W, 1913 m above sea level (1981–2010 averages, 1951–2010 extremes)
Month	Jan	Feb	Mar	Apr	May	Jun	Jul	Aug	Sep	Oct	Nov	Dec	Year
Record high °C (°F)	29.5 (85.1)	32.5 (90.5)	35.0 (95.0)	37.0 (98.6)	38.0 (100.4)	39.0 (102.2)	38.0 (100.4)	36.0 (96.8)	35.0 (95.0)	33.5 (92.3)	29.5 (85.1)	29.5 (85.1)	39.0 (102.2)
Mean daily maximum °C (°F)	20.4 (68.7)	23.1 (73.6)	26.1 (79.0)	29.0 (84.2)	31.8 (89.2)	30.7 (87.3)	28.5 (83.3)	28.1 (82.6)	26.5 (79.7)	25.7 (78.3)	23.5 (74.3)	21.4 (70.5)	26.2 (79.2)
Daily mean °C (°F)	11.6 (52.9)	13.8 (56.8)	16.3 (61.3)	19.3 (66.7)	22.3 (72.1)	22.6 (72.7)	21.3 (70.3)	20.8 (69.4)	19.6 (67.3)	17.6 (63.7)	14.6 (58.3)	12.1 (53.8)	17.7 (63.9)
Mean daily minimum °C (°F)	2.8 (37.0)	4.6 (40.3)	6.5 (43.7)	9.5 (49.1)	12.8 (55.0)	14.5 (58.1)	14.1 (57.4)	13.5 (56.3)	12.7 (54.9)	9.5 (49.1)	5.7 (42.3)	2.7 (36.9)	9.1 (48.4)
Record low °C (°F)	−8.0 (17.6)	−5.5 (22.1)	−6.0 (21.2)	−0.5 (31.1)	2.5 (36.5)	5.0 (41.0)	6.0 (42.8)	6.0 (42.8)	4.0 (39.2)	−2.5 (27.5)	−4.5 (23.9)	−9.5 (14.9)	−9.5 (14.9)
Average precipitation mm (inches)	9.9 (0.39)	7.3 (0.29)	2.1 (0.08)	5.9 (0.23)	16.8 (0.66)	72.9 (2.87)	77.0 (3.03)	80.5 (3.17)	74.4 (2.93)	35.3 (1.39)	10.3 (0.41)	12.9 (0.51)	405.3 (15.96)
Average rainy days (≥ 1 mm)	1.7	0.9	0.6	1.4	2.4	8.3	10.8	10.9	8.9	4.4	1.4	1.7	53.4
Source: Servicio Meteorológico Nacional

== History ==
Prior to the arrival of the Spanish, the area in what is now the municipality of General Francisco R. Murguía was inhabited by Chichimeca peoples. The expedition of Francisco de Ibarra arrived in the area on 5 August 1558, naming it Santa Maria de las Nieves after the feast on that day. In the 18th century it took the name of Real de Minas in reference to the local mining activities, but was renamed Nieves later in the same century.

After the independence of Mexico, Nieves was one of the original partidos named in Zacatecas's state constitution first enacted on 17 January 1825. It became a free municipality on 19 August 1916. In 1964, the municipality was renamed in honour of General Francisco Murguía, who was born in Mazapil and fought in the Mexican Revolution.

== Administration ==
The municipal government of Francisco R. Murguía comprises a president, a councillor (Spanish: síndico), and thirteen trustees (regidores), eight elected by relative majority and five by proportional representation. The current president of the municipality is Javier Garcia (2021).

== Demographics ==
In the 2010 Mexican Census, the municipality of Francisco R. Murguía recorded a population of 21,974 inhabitants living in 5427 households. The 2015 Intercensal Survey estimated a population of 21,809 inhabitants in Francisco R. Murguía.

INEGI lists 76 localities in the municipality, of which only the municipal seat Nieves is classified as urban. It recorded a population of 5653 inhabitants in the 2010 Census.

== Economy ==
The main economic activity in Francisco R. Murguía is agriculture. The main crops grown are forage oats, beans, and corn. Cattle, sheep and goats are also raised.
