= 2013 Zacatecas state elections =

State election in México

2013 Zacatecas State Elections
- July 7, 2013

30 Deputies for State Congress 58 Municipality Presidents and Councils
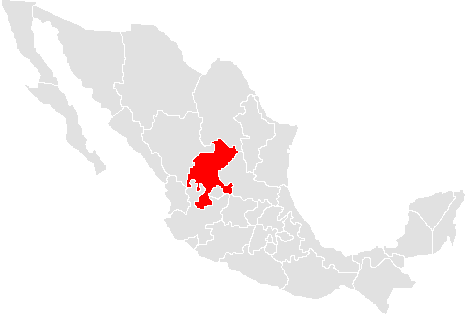
- The location of the state of Zacatecas in Mexico

The 2013 Zacatecas State Elections were held on Sunday, July 7, 2013, and determined the following elected positions in the Mexican state of Zacatecas:

- 58 Municipalities: each with a Municipal President and council members, elected for 3 years and subsequently ineligible for an immediate period after their term.
- 30 Deputies for the State Congress: 18 State Deputies elected by plurality from each Electoral District and 12 elected by the principal of proportional representation.

In the 2013 Zacatecas State Elections, the National Action Party (PAN) and the Party of the Democratic Revolution (PRD) joined as the Alliance to Rescue Zacatecas Coalition (Spanish: Alianza Rescatemos Zacatecas).

== Municipalities ==
=== Overall ===
Party/Coalition	Muni. Pres.	Counc. Mem.	Total
Alliance to Rescue Zacatecas	16		
Institutional Revolutionary Party	36		
Ecologist Green Party of México	4		
Labor Party	1		
Citizens' Movement	0		
New Alliance Party	0		
Independent	1		

(Note: Percentages in the following municipal president races are rounded to the nearest hundredth decimal and candidates that received no votes are excluded unless otherwise notable)

=== Apozol municipal president ===
Party/Coalition	Candidate	Votes	Percentage
Alliance to Rescue Zacatecas		1,184	36.076%
Institutional Revolutionary Party	Won	1,189	36.228%
Ecologist Green Party of México		495	15.082%
Labor Party		9	0.274%
Citizens' Movement		4	0.122%
New Alliance Party		322	9.811%
Null		79	

=== Apulco municipal president ===
Party/Coalition	Candidate	Votes	Percentage
Alliance to Rescue Zacatecas		97	3.235%
Institutional Revolutionary Party		1,309	43.662%
Ecologist Green Party of México	Won	1,512	50.434%
Labor Party		2	0.067%
Citizens' Movement		1	0.033%
New Alliance Party		11	0.367%
Null		66	

=== Atolinga municipal president ===
Party/Coalition	Candidate	Votes	Percentage
Alliance to Rescue Zacatecas		593	34.061%
Institutional Revolutionary Party	Won	1,084	62.263%
Labor Party		3	0.172%
Citizens' Movement		1	0.057%
Null		60	

=== Benito Juárez municipal president ===
Party/Coalition	Candidate	Votes	Percentage
Alliance to Rescue Zacatecas	Won	1,481	58.399%
Institutional Revolutionary Party		965	38.052%
Citizens' Movement		2	0.079%
New Alliance Party		1	0.039%
Null		87	

=== Calera municipal president ===
Party/Coalition	Candidate	Votes	Percentage
Alliance to Rescue Zacatecas		3,247	24.472%
Institutional Revolutionary Party	Won	4,235	31.919%
Ecologist Green Party of México		210	1.583%
Labor Party		2,369	17.855%
Citizens' Movement		782	5.894%
New Alliance Party		1,977	14.901%
Null		448	

=== Cañitas de Felipe municipal president ===
Party/Coalition	Candidate	Votes	Percentage
Alliance to Rescue Zacatecas		217	5.15%
Institutional Revolutionary Party	Won	1,390	32.985%
Ecologist Green Party of México		1,297	30.778%
Labor Party		208	4.936%
Citizens' Movement		1	0.024%
New Alliance Party		369	8.757%
Independent	Gerardo Carrillo Nava	617	14.642%
Null		115	

=== Concepción del Oro municipal president ===
Party/Coalition	Candidate	Votes	Percentage
Alliance to Rescue Zacatecas	Won	3,183	50.205%
Institutional Revolutionary Party		2,479	39.101%
Ecologist Green Party of México		402	6.340%
Labor Party		9	0.142%
Citizens' Movement		1	0.016%
New Alliance Party		7	0.110%
Null		259	

=== Cuauhtémoc municipal president ===
Party/Coalition	Candidate	Votes	Percentage
Alliance to Rescue Zacatecas		1,627	26.276%
Institutional Revolutionary Party		1,347	21.754%
Ecologist Green Party of México	Won	2,718	43.895%
Labor Party		154	2.487%
Citizens' Movement		54	0.872%
New Alliance Party		65	1.050%
Null		227	

=== Chalchihuites municipal president ===
Party/Coalition	Candidate	Votes	Percentage
Alliance to Rescue Zacatecas		577	10.721%
Institutional Revolutionary Party	Won	3,090	57.414%
Ecologist Green Party of México		40	0.743%
Labor Party		1,316	24.452%
Citizens' Movement		1	00.019%
New Alliance Party		168	3.122%
Null		190	

=== El Plateado de Joaquín Amaro municipal president ===
Party/Coalition	Candidate	Votes	Percentage
Alliance to Rescue Zacatecas		553	45.033%
Institutional Revolutionary Party	Won	662	53.909%
Null		13	

=== El Salvador municipal president ===
Party/Coalition	Candidate	Votes	Percentage
Alliance to Rescue Zacatecas		493	26.265%
Institutional Revolutionary Party		471	25.093%
Ecologist Green Party of México	Won	883	47.043%
Labor Party		1	0.053%
New Alliance Party		3	0.16%
Null		26	

=== Fresnillo municipal president ===
In the 2013 Fresnillo municipal presidential election, Benjamín Medrano became México's first openly gay mayor. Medrano owned a gay bar, but publicly opposed gay marriage and adoption during his campaign.

Party/Coalition	Candidate	Votes	Percentage
Alliance to Rescue Zacatecas	Daniel Quintanar Stephano	3,294	3.7%
Institutional Revolutionary Party	Benjamín Medrano Quezada Won	41,084	47.1%
Ecologist Green Party of México	Gustavo Muñoz Mena	2,255	2.67%
Labor Party	Saul Monreal Ávila	36,854	42.3%
Citizens' Movement	Hector Rosales	236	0.2%
New Alliance Party	Francisco Guerrero	737	0.8%
Null		2,589	

=== Fresnillo local council ===
Party/Coalitican	Seats
Labor Party	6

=== Genaro Codina municipal president ===
Party/Coalition	Candidate	Votes	Percentage
Alliance to Rescue Zacatecas		895	21.92%
Institutional Revolutionary Party	Won	1,538	37.668%
Ecologist Green Party of México		775	18.981%
Labor Party		758	18.565%
Citizens' Movement		4	0.098%
New Alliance Party		17	0.416%
Null		96	

=== General Enrique Estrada municipal president ===
Party/Coalition	Candidate	Votes	Percentage
Alliance to Rescue Zacatecas	Gerardo Domínguez	1,110	35.68%
Institutional Revolutionary Party		432	13.886%
Ecologist Green Party of México		59	1.896%
Labor Party		115	3.697%
Citizens' Movement		2	0.064%
New Alliance Party		16	0.514%
Independent	Raúl de Luna Tovar Won	1,377	44.262%
Null		89	

=== General Enrique Estrada local council ===
Party/Coalitican	Seats
National Action Party	1
Party of the Democratic Revolution	1
Institutional Revolutionary Party	1
Independent	12

=== General Francisco R. Murguía municipal president ===
Party/Coalition	Candidate	Votes	Percentage
Alliance to Rescue Zacatecas		2,095	19.018%
Institutional Revolutionary Party	Won	6,015	54.602%
Ecologist Green Party of México		328	2.977%
Labor Party		1,835	16.658%
Citizens' Movement		6	0.054%
New Alliance Party		238	2.160%
Null		499	

=== General Pánfilo Natera municipal president ===
Party/Coalition	Candidate	Votes	Percentage
Alliance to Rescue Zacatecas		2,724	23.366%
Institutional Revolutionary Party	Won	4,046	34.706%
Ecologist Green Party of México		837	7.18%
Labor Party		2,955	25.347%
Citizens' Movement		268	2.299%
New Alliance Party		361	3.097%
Null		467	

=== Guadalupe municipal president ===
Party/Coalition	Candidate	Votes	Percentage
Alliance to Rescue Zacatecas	Gerardo Romo Fonseca	10,494	50%
Institutional Revolutionary Party	Roberto Luevano Ruiz Won	19,148	50%
Ecologist Green Party of México	Enrique Muñoz Delgado	3,640	50%
Labor Party	Jorge González	1,323	3%
Citizens' Movement	Jorge Álvarez Máynez	5,713	12.9%
New Alliance Party	Antonio Ávila Handal	1,351	3%
Null		2,643	

=== Guadalupe local council ===
Party/Coalitican	Seats
National Action Party	1
Party of the Democratic Revolution	2
Ecologist Green Party of Mexico	1
Citizens' Movement	2

=== Huanusco municipal president ===
Party/Coalition	Candidate	Votes	Percentage
Alliance to Rescue Zacatecas		1,121	45.514%
Institutional Revolutionary Party	Won	1,279	51.929%
Ecologist Green Party of México		3	0.122%
Labor Party		2	0.081%
Citizens' Movement		3	0.122%
Null		55	

=== Jalpa municipal president ===
Party/Coalition	Candidate	Votes	Percentage
Alliance to Rescue Zacatecas	Won	4,694	43.239%
Institutional Revolutionary Party		4,074	37.528%
Ecologist Green Party of México		143	1.317%
Labor Party		1,225	11.284%
Citizens' Movement		137	1.262%
New Alliance Party		208	1.916%
Null		375	

=== Jerez municipal president ===
Party/Coalition	Candidate	Votes	Percentage
Alliance to Rescue Zacatecas	Jose Viramontes "PEPE PASTELES" Won	8,313	39.637%
Institutional Revolutionary Party	Artemio Ultreras Cabral	6,293	30.005%
Ecologist Green Party of México	Serafín Bermúdez	4,772	22.753%
Labor Party	Ricardo Trujillo	664	3%
Citizens' Movement	Jaime Ambriz	597	2.7%
New Alliance Party	Juan Carlos Dorado	334	1.5%
Null		1,064	

=== Jerez local council ===
Party/Coalitican	Seats
Institutional Revolutionary Party	3
Ecologist Green Party of Mexico	2

=== Jiménez del Teul municipal president ===
Party/Coalition	Candidate	Votes	Percentage
Alliance to Rescue Zacatecas	Won	1,139	49.371%
Institutional Revolutionary Party		992	43%
Ecologist Green Party of México		1	0.043%
Labor Party		6	0.26%
Citizens' Movement		1	0.043%
New Alliance Party		77	3.338%
Null		91	

=== Juan Aldama municipal president ===
Party/Coalition	Candidate	Votes	Percentage
Alliance to Rescue Zacatecas		2,764	29.587%
Institutional Revolutionary Party	Won	3,455	36.984%
Ecologist Green Party of México		89	0.953%
Labor Party		2,564	27.446%
Citizens' Movement		109	1.167%
New Alliance Party		129	1.381%
Null		231	

=== Juchipila municipal president ===
Party/Coalition	Candidate	Votes	Percentage
Alliance to Rescue Zacatecas		2,199	34.565%
Institutional Revolutionary Party	Won	2,916	45.835%
Ecologist Green Party of México		148	2.326%
Labor Party		360	5.659%
Citizens' Movement		60	0.943%
New Alliance Party		522	8.205%
Null		157	

=== Loreto municipal president ===
Party/Coalition	Candidate	Votes	Percentage
Alliance to Rescue Zacatecas		1,660	9.180%
Institutional Revolutionary Party	Won	5,187	28.686%
Ecologist Green Party of México		4,961	27.436%
Labor Party		4,916	27.187%
Citizens' Movement		461	2.549%
New Alliance Party		27	0.149%
Null		870	

=== Luis Moya municipal president ===
Party/Coalition	Candidate	Votes	Percentage	(Note: Votes cast at polling station '797 Basica' were later nullified by the IEEZ, the electoral authority of Zacatecas, but candidate rankings remained unchanged.)
Alliance to Rescue Zacatecas		391	6.505%	
Institutional Revolutionary Party		2,495	41.507%	
Ecologist Green Party of México	Won	2,509	41.74%	
Labor Party		370	6.155%	
Citizens' Movement		2	0.033%	
New Alliance Party		118	1.963%	
Null		126		

=== Mazapil municipal president ===
Party/Coalition	Candidate	Votes	Percentage
Alliance to Rescue Zacatecas		2,917	28.999%
Institutional Revolutionary Party	Won	3,888	38.652%
Ecologist Green Party of México		45	0.447%
Labor Party		28	0.278%
Citizens' Movement		8	0.08%
New Alliance Party		10	0.099%
Independent	Rigoberto López Martínez	2,572	25.569%
Null		591	

=== Melchor Ocampo municipal president ===
Party/Coalition	Candidate	Votes	Percentage
Alliance to Rescue Zacatecas	Won	1,003	49.777%
Institutional Revolutionary Party		769	38.164%
Ecologist Green Party of México		4	0.199%
Labor Party		148	7.345%
New Alliance Party		5	0.248%
Null		86	

=== Mezquital del Oro municipal president ===
Party/Coalition	Candidate	Votes	Percentage
Alliance to Rescue Zacatecas	Won	932	53.594%
Institutional Revolutionary Party		772	44.393%
Labor Party		2	0.115%
New Alliance Party		1	0.058%
Null		32	

=== Miguel Auza municipal president ===
Party/Coalition	Candidate	Votes	Percentage
Alliance to Rescue Zacatecas		1,737	19.044%
Institutional Revolutionary Party		2,649	29.043%
Ecologist Green Party of México		6	0.066%
Labor Party	Won	3,974	43.57%
Citizens' Movement		304	3.333%
New Alliance Party		128	1.403%
Null		323	

=== Momax municipal president ===
Party/Coalition	Candidate	Votes	Percentage
Alliance to Rescue Zacatecas		612	39.231%
Institutional Revolutionary Party	Won	876	56.154%
Ecologist Green Party of México		5	0.321%
Labor Party		33	2.115%
New Alliance Party		2	0.128%
Null		32	

=== Monte Escobedo municipal president ===
Party/Coalition	Candidate	Votes	Percentage
Alliance to Rescue Zacatecas		1,634	31.237%
Institutional Revolutionary Party	Won	1,715	32.785%
Ecologist Green Party of México		38	0.726%
Labor Party		1,660	31.734%
Citizens' Movement		9	0.172%
New Alliance Party		3	0.057%
Null		172	

=== Morelos municipal president ===
Party/Coalition	Candidate	Votes	Percentage
Alliance to Rescue Zacatecas		962	17.305%
Institutional Revolutionary Party	Won	2,073	37.291%
Ecologist Green Party of México		146	2.626%
Labor Party		956	17.197%
Citizens' Movement		1,209	21.749%
New Alliance Party		17	0.306%
Null		196	

=== Moyahua de Estrada municipal president ===
Party/Coalition	Candidate	Votes	Percentage
Alliance to Rescue Zacatecas		1,075	37.587%
Institutional Revolutionary Party	Won	1,662	58.112%
Ecologist Green Party of México		41	1.434%
Labor Party		3	0.105%
Null		79	

=== Nochistlán de Mejía municipal president ===
Party/Coalition	Candidate	Votes	Percentage
Alliance to Rescue Zacatecas		4,143	28.301%
Institutional Revolutionary Party	Won	6,473	44.218%
Ecologist Green Party of México		1,220	8.334%
Labor Party		2,208	15.083%
Null		595	

=== Noria de Ángeles municipal president ===
Party/Coalition	Candidate	Votes	Percentage
Alliance to Rescue Zacatecas		989	13.229%
Institutional Revolutionary Party	Won	2,145	28.692%
Ecologist Green Party of México		1,010	13.51%
Labor Party		2,096	28.036%
Citizens' Movement		89	1.19%
New Alliance Party		863	11.544%
Null		284	

=== Ojocaliente municipal president ===
Party/Coalition	Candidate	Votes	Percentage
Alliance to Rescue Zacatecas	Won	6,680	43.245%
Institutional Revolutionary Party		4,546	29.43%
Ecologist Green Party of México		490	3.172%
Labor Party		1,319	8.539%
Citizens' Movement		592	3.832%
New Alliance Party		1,221	7.904%
Null		599	

=== Pánuco municipal president ===
Party/Coalition	Candidate	Votes	Percentage
Alliance to Rescue Zacatecas		2,739	32.576%
Institutional Revolutionary Party	Won	4,240	50.428%
Ecologist Green Party of México		61	0.725%
Labor Party		1,023	12.167%
Citizens' Movement		47	0.559%
New Alliance Party		5	0.059%
Null		293	

=== Pinos municipal president ===
Party/Coalition	Candidate	Votes	Percentage
Alliance to Rescue Zacatecas		1,899	5.81%
Institutional Revolutionary Party	Won	14,505	44.375%
Ecologist Green Party of Mexico		202	0.618%
Labor Party		9,319	28.51%
Citizens Movement		170	0.520%
New Alliance Party		168	0.514%
Independent	Florentino Gomez Lara	5,187	15.869%
Null		1,237	

=== Pinos local council ===
Party/Coalitican	Seats	Names
Party of the Democratic Revolution	1	
Institutional Revolutionary Party	3	
Labor Party	5	

=== Río Grande municipal president ===
Party/Coalition	Candidate	Votes	Percentage
Alliance to Rescue Zacatecas	Juan José Quirino Salas	6,996	28.562%
Institutional Revolutionary Party	Constantino Castañeda Won	11,794	48.151%
Ecologist Green Party of Mexico		1,325	5.409%
Labor Party		2,168	8.851%
Citizens' Movement		594	2.425%
New Alliance Party		574	2.343%
Null		1,043	

=== Río Grande local council ===
Party/Coalitican	Seats	Names
National Action Party	1	
Party of the Democratic Revolution	3	
Ecologist Green Party of Mexico	1	
Labor Party	1	

=== Saín Alto municipal president ===
Party/Coalition	Candidate	Votes	Percentage
Alliance to Rescue Zacatecas		3,358	32.048%
Institutional Revolutionary Party	Won	3,667	34.997%
Ecologist Green Party of México		2,769	26.427%
Labor Party		205	1.956%
Citizens' Movement		129	1.231%
New Alliance Party		131	1.25%
Null		219	

=== Santa María de la Paz municipal president ===
Party/Coalition	Candidate	Votes	Percentage
Alliance to Rescue Zacatecas	Won	759	47.055%
Institutional Revolutionary Party		559	34.656%
Ecologist Green Party of México		21	1.302%
Labor Party		201	12.461%
Citizens' Movement		1	0.062%
New Alliance Party		10	0.62%
Null		62	

=== Sombrerete municipal president ===
Party/Coalition	Candidate	Votes	Percentage
Alliance to Rescue Zacatecas	Juan Ángel Castañeda Lizardo Won	8,425	34.29%
Institutional Revolutionary Party	Cecilio Murillo Murillo	8,384	34.13%
Ecologist Green Party of México	Juan Quiroz García	1,150	4.68%
Labor Party	José Cortés Ramírez	297	1.2%
Citizens' Movement	Erika Mora Flores	152	0.61%
New Alliance Party	María Elia Reyes Hidalgo	2,925	11.9%
Independent	Israel Espinosa Jaime	614	2.49%
Independent	Miguel Morales García	1,499	6.1%
Null		1,117	

=== Susticacán municipal president ===
Party/Coalition	Candidate	Votes	Percentage
Alliance to Rescue Zacatecas		45	5.0733%
Institutional Revolutionary Party	Won	396	44.645%
Ecologist Green Party of México		120	13.529%
Labor Party		296	33.371%
New Alliance Party		3	0.338%
Null		27	

=== Tabasco municipal president ===
Party/Coalition	Candidate	Votes	Percentage
Alliance to Rescue Zacatecas	Won	3,942	50.924%
Institutional Revolutionary Party		2,756	35.603%
Ecologist Green Party of México		23	0.297%
Labor Party		505	6.524%
Citizens' Movement		5	0.065%
New Alliance Party		288	3.72%
Null		222	

=== Tepechitlán municipal president ===
Party/Coalition	Candidate	Votes	Percentage
Alliance to Rescue Zacatecas		1,526	31.858%
Institutional Revolutionary Party	Won	2,261	47.203%
Ecologist Green Party of México		1	0.021%
Labor Party		1	0.021%
Citizens' Movement		829	17.307%
New Alliance Party		21	0.438%
Null		151	

=== Tepetongo municipal president ===
Party/Coalition	Candidate	Votes	Percentage
Alliance to Rescue Zacatecas		1,796	40.633%
Institutional Revolutionary Party	Won	2,366	53.529%
Ecologist Green Party of México		60	1.357%
Labor Party		72	1.629%
Citizens' Movement		1	0.023%
New Alliance Party		7	0.158%
Null		118	

=== Teúl de González Ortega municipal president ===
Party/Coalition	Candidate	Votes	Percentage
Alliance to Rescue Zacatecas	Won	1,608	53.386%
Institutional Revolutionary Party		1,246	41.368%
Labor Party		35	1.162%
New Alliance Party		24	0.797%
Null		99	

=== Tlaltenango de Sánchez Román municipal president ===
Party/Coalition	Candidate	Votes	Percentage
Alliance to Rescue Zacatecas		2,606	22.6%
Institutional Revolutionary Party	Won	4,849	42.052%
Ecologist Green Party of México		3,509	30.431%
Labor Party		31	0.269%
Citizens' Movement		13	0.11%
New Alliance Party		112	0.971%
Null		411	

=== Trancoso municipal president ===
Party/Coalition	Candidate	Votes	Percentage
Alliance to Rescue Zacatecas	Won	2,273	28.692%
Institutional Revolutionary Party		1,659	20.942%
Ecologist Green Party of México		758	9.568%
Labor Party		1,931	24.375%
Citizens' Movement		123	1.553%
New Alliance Party		918	11.588%
Null		260	

=== Trinidad García de la Cadena municipal president ===
Party/Coalition	Candidate	Votes	Percentage
Alliance to Rescue Zacatecas		784	45.768%
Institutional Revolutionary Party	Won	878	51.255%
Labor Party		1	0.058%
Null		50	

=== Valparaíso municipal president ===
Party/Coalition	Candidate	Votes	Percentage
Alliance to Rescue Zacatecas	Won	8,501	52.134%
Institutional Revolutionary Party		6,783	41.598%
Ecologist Green Party of México		324	1.987%
Labor Party		204	1.251%
Citizens' Movement		13	0.08%
New Alliance Party		50	0.307%
Null		431	

=== Vetagrande municipal president ===
Party/Coalition	Candidate	Votes	Percentage
Alliance to Rescue Zacatecas		542	10.615%
Institutional Revolutionary Party	Won	2,245	43.968%
Ecologist Green Party of México		1	0.02%
Labor Party		2,043	40.012%
Citizens' Movement		88	1.723%
New Alliance Party		59	1.156%
Null		128	

=== Villa de Cos municipal president ===
Party/Coalition	Candidate	Votes	Percentage
Alliance to Rescue Zacatecas		3,803	23.086%
Institutional Revolutionary Party	Won	4,213	25.575%
Ecologist Green Party of México		1,745	10.593%
Labor Party		2,660	16.148%
Citizens' Movement		1,435	8.711%
New Alliance Party		81	0.492%
Independent	César Gerardo González Zavala	1918	11.643%
Null		618	

=== Villa Garcíca municipal president ===
Party/Coalition	Candidate	Votes	Percentage
Alliance to Rescue Zacatecas		1,915	20.881%
Institutional Revolutionary Party	Won	2,902	31.643%
Ecologist Green Party of México		156	1.701%
Labor Party		2,632	28.699%
Citizens' Movement		4	0.044%
New Alliance Party		21	0.229%
Independent	Víctor Manuel Guerrero Cruz	1,340	14.611%
Null		201	

=== Villa González Ortega municipal president ===
Party/Coalition	Candidate	Votes	Percentage
Alliance to Rescue Zacatecas		1,446	21.972%
Institutional Revolutionary Party	Won	2,467	37.487%
Ecologist Green Party of México		1,042	15.833%
Labor Party		1,289	19.587%
Citizens' Movement		35	0.532%
New Alliance Party		61	0.927%
Null		241	

=== Villa Hidalgo municipal president ===
Party/Coalition	Candidate	Votes	Percentage
Alliance to Rescue Zacatecas	Won	5,025	51.628%
Institutional Revolutionary Party		3,771	38.744%
Ecologist Green Party of México		15	0.154%
Labor Party		546	5.61%
Citizens' Movement		61	0.627%
New Alliance Party		23	0.236%
Null		292	

=== Villanueva municipal president ===
Party/Coalition	Candidate	Votes	Percentage
Alliance to Rescue Zacatecas	Won	6,493	40.576%
Institutional Revolutionary Party		6,249	39.051%
Ecologist Green Party of México		14	0.087%
Labor Party		277	1.419%
Citizens' Movement		5	0.031%
New Alliance Party		2,513	15.704%
Null		451	

=== Zacatecas municipal president ===
Party/Coalitican	Candidates	Votes	Percentage
Alliance to Rescue Zacatecas	Fernando González Bueno	7,167	14.7%
Institutional Revolutionary Party	Carlos Peña Badillo Won	17,313	35.5%
Ecologist Green Party of México	Xerardo Ramírez Muñoz	15,280	31.3%
Labor Party	Martin Uvario Gaspar	1,675	3.4%
Citizens' Movement	Salvador Llamas	1,813	3.7%
New Alliance Party	Rogelio Lara Alvarado	875	1.7%
Independent	Rogelio Cárdenas Hernández	2,299	4.7%
Null		2,412	

=== Zacatecas local council ===
Party/Coalitican	Seats	Names
National Action Party	1	
Party of the Democratic Revolution	1	
Ecologist Green Party of Mexico	4	

== State congress ==
=== Overall ===
Party/Coalition	Plurality	Proportional	Total
Alliance to Rescue Zacatecas	4	4	8
Institutional Revolutionary Party	13	1	14
Labor Party	1	3	4
Ecologist Green Party of México	0	2	2
New Alliance Party	0	1	1
Citizens' Movement	0	1	1

=== State deputies elected by plurality (relative majority) ===
District	Party/Coalition	Elected Candidate
1st		Hector Zirahuen Pastor Alvarado
2nd		Claudia Edith Anaya Mota
3rd		Rafael Gutierrez Martinez
4th		Araceli Guerrero Esquivel
5th		Cliserio del Real Hernandez
6th		Felipe de Jesús Rivera Rodriguez
7th		Ismael Solis Mares
8th		Jose Haro de la Torre
9th		Jose Luis Figueroa Rangel
10th		Ivan de Santiago Beltran
11th		Javier Torres Rodriguez
12th		Luz Margarita Chavez Garcia
13th		Irene Buendia Balderas
14th		Maria Hilda Ramos Martinez
15th		Mario Cervantes Gonzalez
16th		Erica del Carmen Velazquez Vacio
17th		Carlos Alberto Pedroza Morales
18th		Juan Carlos Regis Adame

=== State deputies elected by proportionality ===
District	Party	Elected Candidate
1st		Luis Acosta Jaime
2nd		Maria Guadalupe Medina Padilla
3rd		Rafael Hurtado Bueno
4th		Rafael Flores Mendoza
5th		Eugenia Flores Hernández
6th		Alfredo Femat Bañuelos
7th		Maria Soledad Luévano Cantú
8th		J. Guadalupe Hernandez Rios
9th		Cuauhtemoc Calderon Galvan
10th		Susana Rodríguez Márquez
11th		Cesar Augusto Deras Almodova
12th		Ma. Elena Nava Martínez

== See also ==
- 2013 Mexican state elections
- Zacatecas
- List of states of Mexico
- Administrative divisions in Mexico
