= 2nd federal electoral district of Zacatecas =

Federal electoral district of Mexico

Zacatecas's 2nd
- Electoral district of the Chamber of Deputies of Mexico

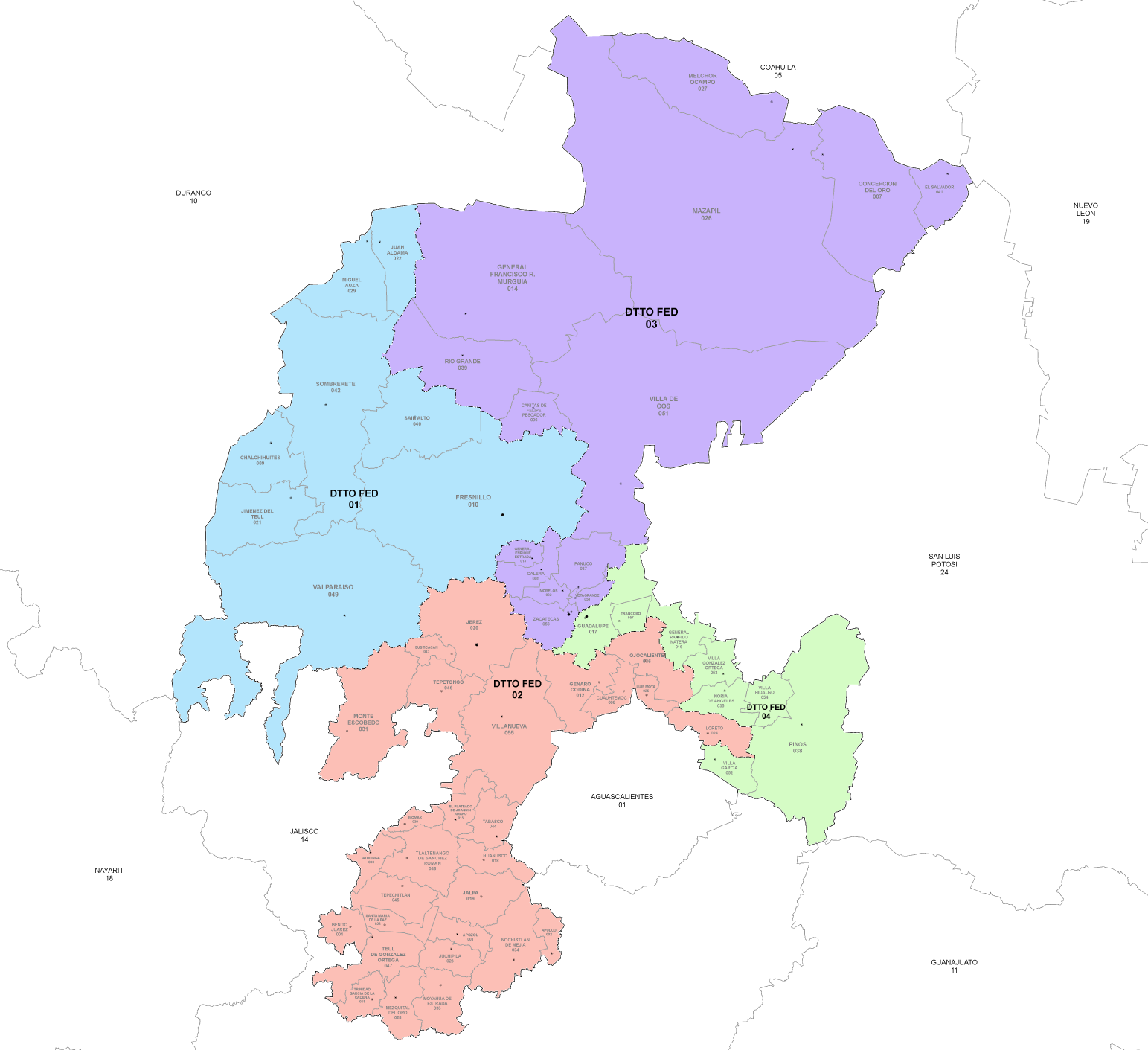
- 2nd district since 2023

Incumbent
- Member: Julia Arcelia Olguín Serna
- Party: ▌Morena
- Congress: 66th (2024–2027)

District
- State: Zacatecas
- Head town: Jerez de García Salinas
- Coordinates: 22°38′N 102°59′W
- Covers: 28 municipalities: Apozol, Apulco, Atolinga, Benito Juárez, Cuauhtémoc, Trinidad García de la Cadena, Genaro Codina, El Plateado de Joaquín Amaro, Huanusco, Jalpa, Jerez, Juchipila, Loreto, Luis Moya, Mezquital del Oro, Momax, Monte Escobedo, Moyahua de Estrada, Nochistlán de Mejía, Ojocaliente, Santa María de la Paz, Susticacán, Tabasco, Tepechitlán, Tepetongo, Teúl de González Ortega, Tlaltenango de Sánchez Román, Villanueva
- PR region: Second
- Precincts: 590
- Population: 403,565 (2020 census)

The 2nd federal electoral district of Zacatecas (Spanish: Distrito electoral federal 02 de Zacatecas) is one of the 300 electoral districts into which Mexico is divided for elections to the federal Chamber of Deputies and one of four such districts in the state of Zacatecas.

It elects one deputy to the lower house of Congress for each three-year legislative session by means of the first-past-the-post system. Votes cast in the district also count towards the calculation of proportional representation ("plurinominal") deputies elected from the second region.

The current member for the district, elected in the 2024 general election, is Julia Arcelia Olguín Serna. Originally elected for the Ecologist Green Party (PVEM), she switched to Morena at the start of the congressional session on 1 September 2024.

== District territory ==
Evolution of electoral district numbers
| | 1974 | 1978 | 1996 | 2005 | 2017 | 2023 |
|---|---|---|---|---|---|---|
| Zacatecas | 4 | 5 | 5 | 4 | 4 | 4 |
| Chamber of Deputies | 196 | 300 | | | | |

Under the 2023 districting plan adopted by the National Electoral Institute (INE), which is to be used for the 2024, 2027 and 2030 federal elections, the 2nd district of Zacatecas covers 590 electoral precincts (secciones electorales) across 28 municipalities in the southern portion of the state.

- Apozol, Apulco, Atolinga, Benito Juárez, Cuauhtémoc, Trinidad García de la Cadena, Genaro Codina, El Plateado de Joaquín Amaro, Huanusco, Jalpa, Jerez, Juchipila, Loreto, Luis Moya, Mezquital del Oro, Momax, Monte Escobedo, Moyahua de Estrada, Nochistlán de Mejía, Ojocaliente, Santa María de la Paz, Susticacán, Tabasco, Tepechitlán, Tepetongo, Teúl de González Ortega, Tlaltenango de Sánchez Román and Villanueva.

The head town (cabecera distrital), where results from individual polling stations are gathered together and tallied, is the city of Jerez de García Salinas. The district reported a population of 403,565 in the 2020 census.

== Deputies returned to Congress ==
(Mexico) National parties
- Current
- PAN
- PRI
- PT
- PVEM
- MC
- Morena
- PAZ
- Somos
- Defunct or local only
- PLM
- PNR
- PRM
- PNM
- PP
- PPS
- PARM
- PFCRN
- CON
- PANAL
- PSD
- PES
- PES
- PRD

Zacatecas's 2nd district
| Election | Deputy | Party | Term | Legislature |
|---|---|---|---|---|
| 1979 | Hermenegildo Fernández Arroyo | Institutional Revolutionary Party | 1979–1982 | 51st Congress |
| 1982 | Antonio Herrera Bocardo | Institutional Revolutionary Party | 1982–1985 | 52nd Congress |
| 1985 | Pedro Goytía Robles | Institutional Revolutionary Party | 1985–1988 | 53rd Congress |
| 1988 | Ricardo Monreal Avila | Institutional Revolutionary Party | 1988–1991 | 54th Congress |
| 1991 | José Bonilla Robles | Institutional Revolutionary Party | 1991–1994 | 55th Congress |
| 1994 | Eustaquio de León Contreras | Institutional Revolutionary Party | 1994–1997 | 56th Congress |
| 1997 | María del Refugio Calderón González | Institutional Revolutionary Party | 1997–2000 | 57th Congress |
| 2000 | Óscar del Real Muñoz | Institutional Revolutionary Party | 2000–2003 | 58th Congress |
| 2003 | Arturo Nahle García | Party of the Democratic Revolution | 2003–2006 | 59th Congress |
| 2006 | Andrés Bermúdez Viramontes (Note: Bermúdez Viramontes died in office on 5 February 2009.); Federico Bernal Frausto | National Action Party (Mexico) | 2006–2009; 2009 | 60th Congress |
| 2009 | Ramón Jiménez Fuentes | Party of the Democratic Revolution | 2009–2012 | 61st Congress |
| 2012 | Julio César Flemate Ramírez | Institutional Revolutionary Party | 2012–2015 | 62nd Congress |
| 2015 | Francisco Escobedo Villegas | Institutional Revolutionary Party | 2015–2018 | 63rd Congress |
| 2018 | Lyndiana Bugarín Cortes | Ecologist Green Party of Mexico | 2018–2021 | 64th Congress |
| 2021 | Miguel Ángel Varela Pinedo; Iván Husain Vitar Soto | National Action Party (Mexico) | 2021–2024; 2024 | 65th Congress |
| 2024 | Julia Arcelia Olguín Serna (Note: Olguín Serna was one of six deputies who switched from the Ecologist Green Party to Morena at the start of the congressional session on 1 September 2024.) | Ecologist Green Party of Mexico National Regeneration Movement | 2024–2027 | 66th Congress |

== Presidential elections ==
Zacatecas's 2nd district
| Election | District won by | Party or coalition | % |
|---|---|---|---|
| 2018 | Andrés Manuel López Obrador | Juntos Haremos Historia | 39.9359 |
| 2024 | Claudia Sheinbaum Pardo | Sigamos Haciendo Historia | 50.0136 |
