= Ramón Jiménez Fuentes =

Mexican politician

- Born: 1 December 1955 (age 70); Nochistlán, Zacatecas, Mexico
- Occupation: Politician
- Political party: PRD

Ramón Jiménez Fuentes (born 1 December 1955) is a Mexican politician from the Party of the Democratic Revolution (PRD). In the 2009 mid-terms he was elected to the Chamber of Deputies to represent the second district of Zacatecas during the 61st session of Congress. He previously served as the municipal president of Nochistlán from 2004 to 2007.
