= Federico Bernal Frausto =

Mexican politician

- Born: 31 October 1953 (age 72); Zacatecas, Mexico
- Occupation: Politician
- Political party: PAN

Federico Bernal Frausto (born 31 October 1953) is a Mexican politician from the National Action Party (PAN). In 2009 he served in the Chamber of Deputies, representing Zacatecas's second district, as the substitute for Andrés Bermúdez Viramontes, who died in office on 5 February 2009. He had previously served in the Congress of Zacatecas.

== See also ==
- es:Elecciones estatales de Zacatecas de 1998

Preceded by	Municipal President of Tabasco, Zacatecas; 1998 – 2001	Succeeded by
