= José Eulogio Bonilla =

Mexican politician and lawyer

- Born: 25 January 1946 (age 80); Fresnillo, Zacatecas, Mexico
- Occupations: Politician and lawyer
- Political party: PRI

José Eulogio Bonilla Robles (born 25 January 1946) is a Mexican lawyer and politician affiliated with the Institutional Revolutionary Party (PRI). He served as a senator during the 58th and 59th sessions of Congress (2000–2006) representing Zacatecas, and as a federal deputy during the 55th (for Zacatecas's 2nd district) and 57th (for Zacatecas's 1st) sessions. He was also a local deputy in the 46th session of the Congress of Zacatecas.
