= Congress of Zacatecas =

Legislature of Zacatecas, Mexico

Congress of the State of Zacatecas Congreso del Estado de Zacatecas
- LXV Legislature

Type
- Type: Unicameral

History
- Founded: March 24, 1822

Structure
- Seats: 30
- Political groups: Morena (11) PRI (5) PAN (4) PVEM (3) MC (2) PRD (2) PT (2) PANAL (1)

Elections
- Voting system: First-past-the-post for 18 electoral district seats and Mixed-member proportional representation for 12 proportional representation seats
- Last election: 2 June 2024
- Next election: 2027

Meeting place
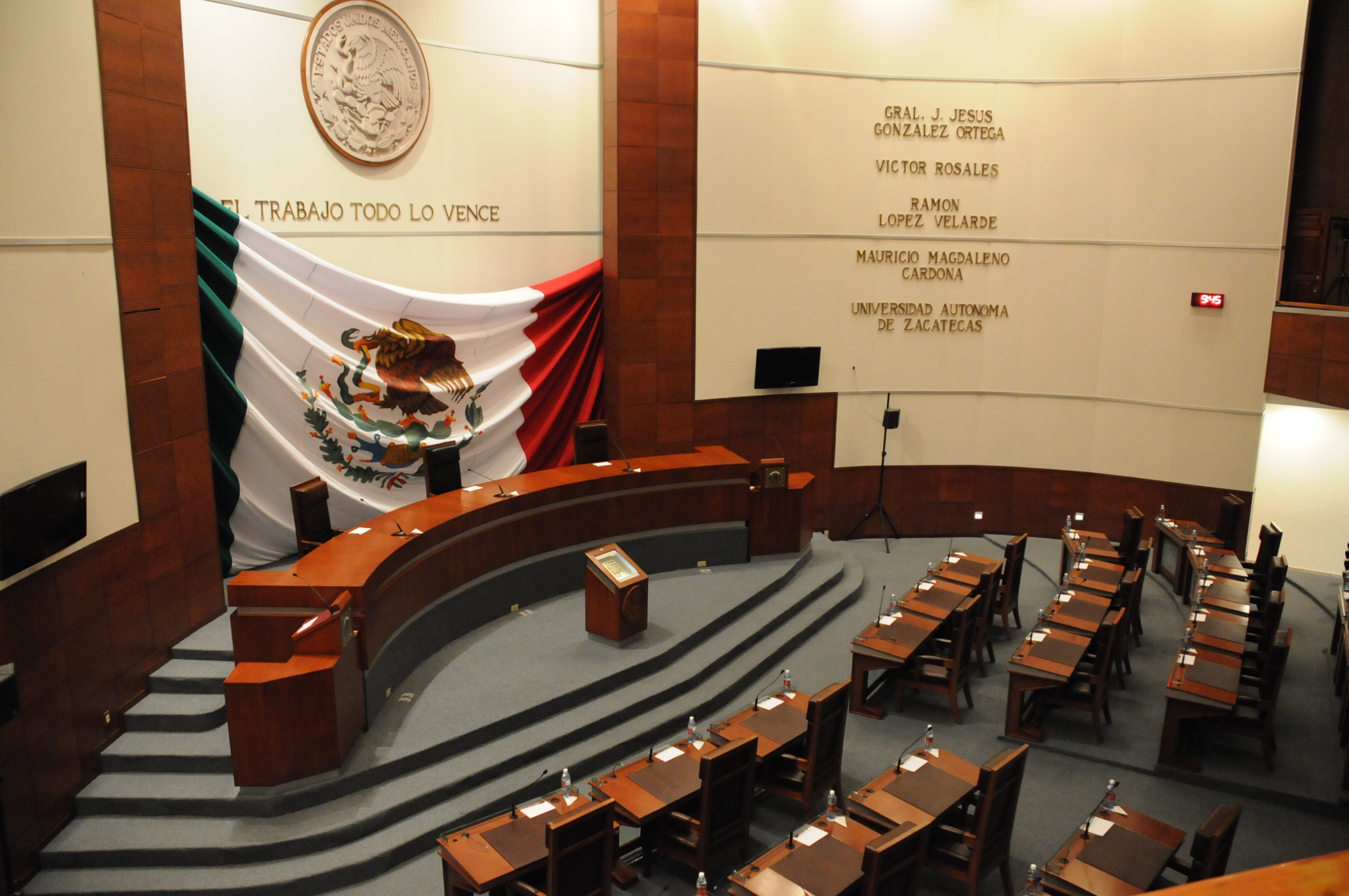
- Legislative Palace; Zacatecas, Zacatecas, Mexico

Website
- www.congresozac.gob.mx

The Congress of the State of Zacatecas (Spanish: Congreso del Estado de Zacatecas) is the legislative branch of the government of the State of Zacatecas. The Congress is the governmental deliberative body of Zacatecas, which is equal to, and independent of, the executive.

The Congress is unicameral and consists of 30 deputies. 18 deputies are elected on a first-past-the-post basis, one for each district in which the entity is divided, while 12 are elected through a system of proportional representation. Deputies are elected to serve for a three-year term.

== Current Composition ==
The current LXV Legislature of the Congress of Zacatecas initiated on September 7, 2024 and will conclude on September 6, 2027. The current legislature is in session concurrent with the governorship of David Monreal Ávila.

=== Single Member Districts ===
District	Constituency	Deputy	Party
I	Zacatecas	Ruth Calderón Babún	Morena
II	Zacatecas	Santos Antonio González Huerta	Morena
III	Guadalupe	Ma Teresa López García	PAN
IV	Guadalupe	Saúl de Jesús Cordero Becerril	Morena
V	Fresnillo	Susana Andrea Barragán Espinosa	Morena
VI	Fresnillo	Jesús Eduardo Badillo Méndez	PAN
VII	Fresnillo	Martín Álvarez Casio	Morena
VIII	Ojocaliente	Eleuterio Ramos Leal	PRD
IX	Loreto	Georgia Fernanda Miranda Herrera	PVEM
X	Jerez	José Luis González Orozco	PVEM
XI	Villanueva	Dayanne Cruz Hernández	PRI
XII	Villa de Cos	José David González Hernández	PRI
XIII	Jalpa	Imelda Mauricio Esparza	Morena
XIV	Tlatenango	Oscar Rafael Novella Macías	Morena
XV	Pinos	Maribel Villalpando Haro	Morena
XVI	Río Grande	Lyndiana Elizabeth Bugarín Cortés	PVEM
XVII	Sombrerete	Jaime Manuel Esquivel Hurtado	Morena
XVIII	Juan Aldama	Jesús Padilla Estrada	Morena

=== Proportional Representation ===
Deputy	Party
Alfredo Femat Bañuelos	PT
Ana María Romo Fonseca	MC
Carlos Aurelio Peña Badillo	PRI
Guadalupe Isadora Santivañez Ríos	PRI
Karla Esmeralda Rivera Rodríguez	PANAL
Karla Guadalupe Estrada García	PAN
Ma. Elena Canales Castañeda	PRD
Marco Vinicio Flores Guerrero	MC
María Dolores Trejo Calzada	Morena
Pedro Martínez Flores	PAN
Renata Libertad Ávila Valdez	PT
Roberto Lamas Alvarado	PRI

== See also ==
- List of Mexican state congresses
