= Beatriz de Padilla =

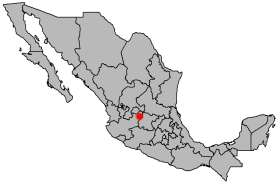
Lagos de Moreno, the birthplace and residence of Beatriz de Padilla, located near Guadalajara in western New Spain.

Beatriz de Padilla (born 1620s) was a Mexican-born woman who rose from slavery to property ownership. Her legal battles and persecution by the Spanish Inquisition gained her notability during her lifetime. In 1650 de Padilla was accused of using magic to seduce and poison priest Diego Ortiz whom she had a long-lasting love affair with. De Padilla, who claimed to be a Morisco, was born into slavery. She was the daughter of a Mulatta mother and a Spaniard father. She and her mother were eventually freed for their exemplary service. De Padilla was the mistress to many powerful men, but the man she spent the longest with and was the closest to, Diego Ortiz, eventually promised her and their son his land and estate. Her relationship with Ortiz and his subsequent death sparked legal accusations against her and she was put on trial by the Spanish Inquisition in Mexico City. However, due to her candid testimony (and allegedly her beauty) she was acquitted of all charges and returned to her home in Lagos as a free property owner.

== Caste system ==
During de Padilla's life, New Spain followed a caste system that categorized people based on the amount of "pure blood" or Spanish blood. This system limited the already restricted social mobility of non-Spaniard races and those who possessed a lesser amount of Spanish blood were segregated from jobs, were banned from carrying arms, had to live with their masters and could not be in large groups. As one of de Padilla's parents was a mulatta slave and possessed African blood, de Padilla was not considered a Spaniard and lived as a slave.

Despite being categorized as a non-Spaniard under the caste system, de Padilla would have been able to enjoy some of the flexibility that came with being considered a non-Spanish woman. Caste females did not have to adhere to the same social regulations as "pure blood" Spanish women. Spanish colonial society did not believe that caste females had any honor to keep or defend, whereas Spanish women were expected to adhere to purity standards - however this did not stop some from seeing caste females' behaviors as a threat to Christian order and morality.

== Legal issues ==
According to sources, De Padilla took many lovers, some of whom were of high standing. As a consequence, she was frequently accused by authorities immoral behaviors and violating the expected gender roles of Spanish/Christian women.

De Padilla was also accused of mistreating her slaves and servants. In one instance, one of de Padilla's servants, Catalina Ia Garay, accused her of burning her with hot grease and branding her. These claims were unfounded, but De Padilla confessed to them.

De Padilla was targeted by the Spanish Inquisition for her relationship with Diego Ortiz Saavedra, a wealthy priest. Ortiz Saavedra had fathered an illegitimate child with de Padilla. Before he died, he announced that he was leaving his belongings to de Padilla and the child. As a result, his family denounced her to the Inquisition.

At the hearings, witnesses claimed that de Padilla had poisoned Ortiz Saavedra by placing her menstrual blood in his bathwater. They also claimed that she caused him to lose his sanity before his death. The Inquisition brought in La Garay as a witness. She repeated her earlier accusations and added more of them. However, they were later disproved.

In her defense, De Padilla stated that Ortiz Saavedra had loved her and that his family had falsified the claims to take her inheritance. The Inquisition exonerated and released de Padilla. She returned to Lago and resumed a relationship with a former lover, the lord mayor of Juchipila, Don Diego de las Marinas.
