= Julio César Flemate =

Mexican politician

- Born: 26 September 1966 (age 59); Juchipila, Zacatecas, Mexico
- Occupation: Politician
- Political party: PRI

Julio César Flemate Ramírez (born 26 September 1966) is a Mexican politician affiliated with the Institutional Revolutionary Party (PRI). In the 2012 general election he was elected to the Chamber of Deputies to represent the second district of Zacatecas during the 62nd session of Congress.
