= Óscar del Real Muñoz =

Mexican politician

- Born: 4 March 1948 (age 78); Zacatecas, Mexico
- Occupation: Politician
- Political party: PRI

Óscar Alfonso del Real Muñoz (born 4 March 1948) is a Mexican politician from the Institutional Revolutionary Party (PRI). In the 2000 general election he was elected to the Chamber of Deputies to represent the second district of Zacatecas during the 58th session of Congress.
