= Genaro Codina, Zacatecas =

Genaro Codina
- Municipality
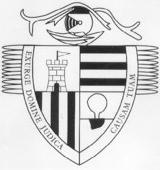
- Coat of arms

- Location of Genaro Codina Genaro Codina (Mexico)
- Coordinates: 22°29′15″N 102°27′14″W
- Country: Mexico
- State: Zacatecas
- Established: 29 October 1833
- Seat: Genaro Codina

Government
  - Municipal president: Mario Adrián Reyes Santana

Area
  - Total: 794.8 km^{2} (306.9 sq mi)
- Elevation (of seat): 2,209 m (7,247 ft)

Population (2020 Census)
  - Total: 8,168
  - Density: 10.28/km^{2} (26.62/sq mi)
  - Seat: 1,428
- Time zone: UTC-6 (Central)
- Postal codes: 98660–98677
- Area code: 458
- Website: Official website

Genaro Codina is a municipality in the Mexican state of Zacatecas, located approximately 30 kilometres (19 mi) southwest of the state capital at the city of Zacatecas. It is named after Genaro Codina, musician and composer of the state anthem, the "March of Zacatecas".

== Geography ==
The municipality of Genaro Codina is located at an elevation between 2,000 and 3,100 metres (6,600–10,200 ft) in the Sierra Fría in south-central Zacatecas. It borders the Zacatecan municipalities of Villanueva to the west, Zacatecas to the northwest, Guadalupe to the north, Ojocaliente to the northeast, and Cuauhtémoc to the east. It also borders the municipalities of Rincón de Romos to the southeast and San José de Gracia to the south, which are both in the state of Aguascalientes. Genaro Codina covers an area of 794.8 square kilometres (306.9 sq mi) and comprises 1.1% of the state's area.

As of 2009, 14% of the land in Genaro Codina is used for agriculture. The remainder of the land cover comprises grassland (50.2%), forest (28.6%), and matorral (6.7%). The municipality is situated in the drainage basin of the Río Grande de Santiago. The eastern two-thirds of the municipality is drained by the San Pedro or Aguascalientes River, a tributary of the Río Verde, while the western third is drained by the Juchipila River and its tributaries.

Genaro Codina's climate ranges from semiarid in most of the municipality to temperate in the mountainous south. Average temperatures in the municipality range between 12 and 18 °C (54–64 °F), and average annual precipitation ranges between 400 and 800 millimetres (16–31 in).

Climate data for Genaro Codina weather station at 22°29′15″N 102°27′36″W, 2176 m above sea level (1981–2010 averages, 1951–2010 extremes)
Month	Jan	Feb	Mar	Apr	May	Jun	Jul	Aug	Sep	Oct	Nov	Dec	Year
Record high °C (°F)	29.0 (84.2)	35.0 (95.0)	41.0 (105.8)	36.5 (97.7)	41.0 (105.8)	36.5 (97.7)	34.0 (93.2)	34.0 (93.2)	34.0 (93.2)	31.5 (88.7)	32.0 (89.6)	32.0 (89.6)	41.0 (105.8)
Mean daily maximum °C (°F)	21.1 (70.0)	22.7 (72.9)	25.1 (77.2)	27.0 (80.6)	28.9 (84.0)	27.8 (82.0)	25.3 (77.5)	25.2 (77.4)	25.1 (77.2)	24.1 (75.4)	23.0 (73.4)	21.8 (71.2)	24.8 (76.6)
Daily mean °C (°F)	11.3 (52.3)	12.6 (54.7)	14.7 (58.5)	16.7 (62.1)	19.1 (66.4)	19.4 (66.9)	18.1 (64.6)	18.0 (64.4)	17.6 (63.7)	15.5 (59.9)	13.2 (55.8)	12.2 (54.0)	15.7 (60.3)
Mean daily minimum °C (°F)	1.4 (34.5)	2.5 (36.5)	4.3 (39.7)	6.4 (43.5)	9.3 (48.7)	11.1 (52.0)	10.9 (51.6)	10.7 (51.3)	10.0 (50.0)	6.8 (44.2)	3.5 (38.3)	2.5 (36.5)	6.6 (43.9)
Record low °C (°F)	−6.5 (20.3)	−9.0 (15.8)	−5.0 (23.0)	−1.0 (30.2)	0.0 (32.0)	3.0 (37.4)	4.0 (39.2)	1.0 (33.8)	−1.0 (30.2)	−3.0 (26.6)	−7.0 (19.4)	−9.0 (15.8)	−9.0 (15.8)
Average precipitation mm (inches)	16.7 (0.66)	10.4 (0.41)	1.9 (0.07)	9.6 (0.38)	26.8 (1.06)	91.5 (3.60)	106.1 (4.18)	86.7 (3.41)	66.6 (2.62)	37.0 (1.46)	8.3 (0.33)	10.9 (0.43)	472.5 (18.60)
Average rainy days (≥ 1 mm)	1.9	1.2	0.5	1.3	3.6	8.1	9.8	8.9	7.2	3.9	1.2	1.6	49.2
Source: Servicio Meteorológico Nacional

== History ==
At the time of Spanish contact, the area of what is now Genaro Codina was populated by the Zacateco people. In 1542, the settlement of San José de la Ysla (or Isla) was founded. Tlaxcalan colonists joined the settlement in 1591.

After independence, San José de la Ysla formed part of the partido or district of Zacatecas in the state of the same name. Its municipal government (junta municipal) was first established on 29 October 1833. It dropped the "San" from its name in 1935, becoming known as José de la Isla. It adopted its present name beginning on 1 January 1958, in honour of the composer of the Zacatecan state anthem. A health centre was inaugurated in Genaro Codina in 1964, and electricity and water services followed in 1971.

== Administration ==
The municipal government of Genaro Codina comprises a president, a councillor (Spanish: síndico), and seven trustees (regidores), four elected by relative majority and three by proportional representation. The current president of the municipality is Mario Adrián Reyes Santana.

== Demographics ==
In the 2020 Census, Genaro Codina recorded a population of 8168 inhabitants living in 2054 households. The 2010 Census recorded a population of 8104 inhabitants in Genaro Codina.

There are 54 inhabited localities in the municipality, of which only the municipal seat, also called Genaro Codina, is classified as urban. It recorded a population of 1428 inhabitants in the 2020 Census.

== Economy and infrastructure ==
In the 2015 Intercensal Survey, 21% of Genaro Codina's workforce was employed in the primary sector, 46% in the secondary sector, 7% in commerce, and 23% in services. The main crops grown in Genaro Codina are corn (grain and silage) and prickly pear.

Federal Highway 45D runs through the northeastern corner of the municipality, connecting it to Guadalupe and Zacatecas to the north, and to the city of Aguascalientes to the south.
