= El Remolino =

Town in Zacatecas, Mexico

- Town
- Location within Zacatecas Location within Mexico
- Coordinates: 21°21′53″N 103°7′27″W
- Country: Mexico
- State: Zacatecas
- Municipality: Juchipila
- Elevation: 2,198 m (7,211 ft)

Population
  - Total: 737
- Time zone: UTC-6 (Zona Centro)
- Website: http://elremolino.com.mx

El Remolino is a community located in the municipality of Juchipila in Zacatecas, Mexico. The population of El Remolino is 737 people and is 1220 meters above sea level.

El Remolino was founded in the late eighteenth century, but there is evidence to suggest that people already inhabited the area upon the settlement's founding.

== Culture ==
The Feria Nacional de El Remolino (FENARE) English: National Fair of The Remolino first took place in the mid-nineteenth century in honor of the Holy Cross. In its infancy, the event consisted of processions and dances annually on the third of May. Over the years, FENARE grew to include community theater productions, amusement rides, and other secular attractions. Its growth had made it one of the most significant events in the municipality of Juchipila.

FENARE is organized by a local committee elected each year by the previous year's committee. The committee raises funds for events such as the traditional lotería on Sundays after Mass through the sale of gorditas and charity dinners.

This festival took place annually without fail until 2009, when the 2009 H1N1 pandemic led Zacatecas state authorities to prohibit large-scale community events.

== Landmarks ==
One major landmark in El Remolino is the Hill of the Windows, a major archeological site for the Caxcan indigenous people. It consists of a hill containing a cave with a characteristic wall with windows. The site is notable for providing refuge for the Caxcan people during and after the Mixtón War.

== Demographics ==
El Remolino has experienced a decline in its population from emigration to the United States. Many former members of the El Remolino community are now residents of Los Angeles, California.

== Education ==
El Remolino offers public education at a kindergarten and primary level. Secondary education is provided extramurally. Inhabitants of the area seeking tertiary education often attend the Polytechnic University of Southern Zacatecas, situated in the town.

== Economy ==
Trade in El Remolino is limited to locally owned grocery stores, convenience stores, and a cyber cafe.
