= Nochistlán =

City in the Mexican state of Zacatecas

Nochistlán, Zacatecas
- City
- Nochistlán de Mejía
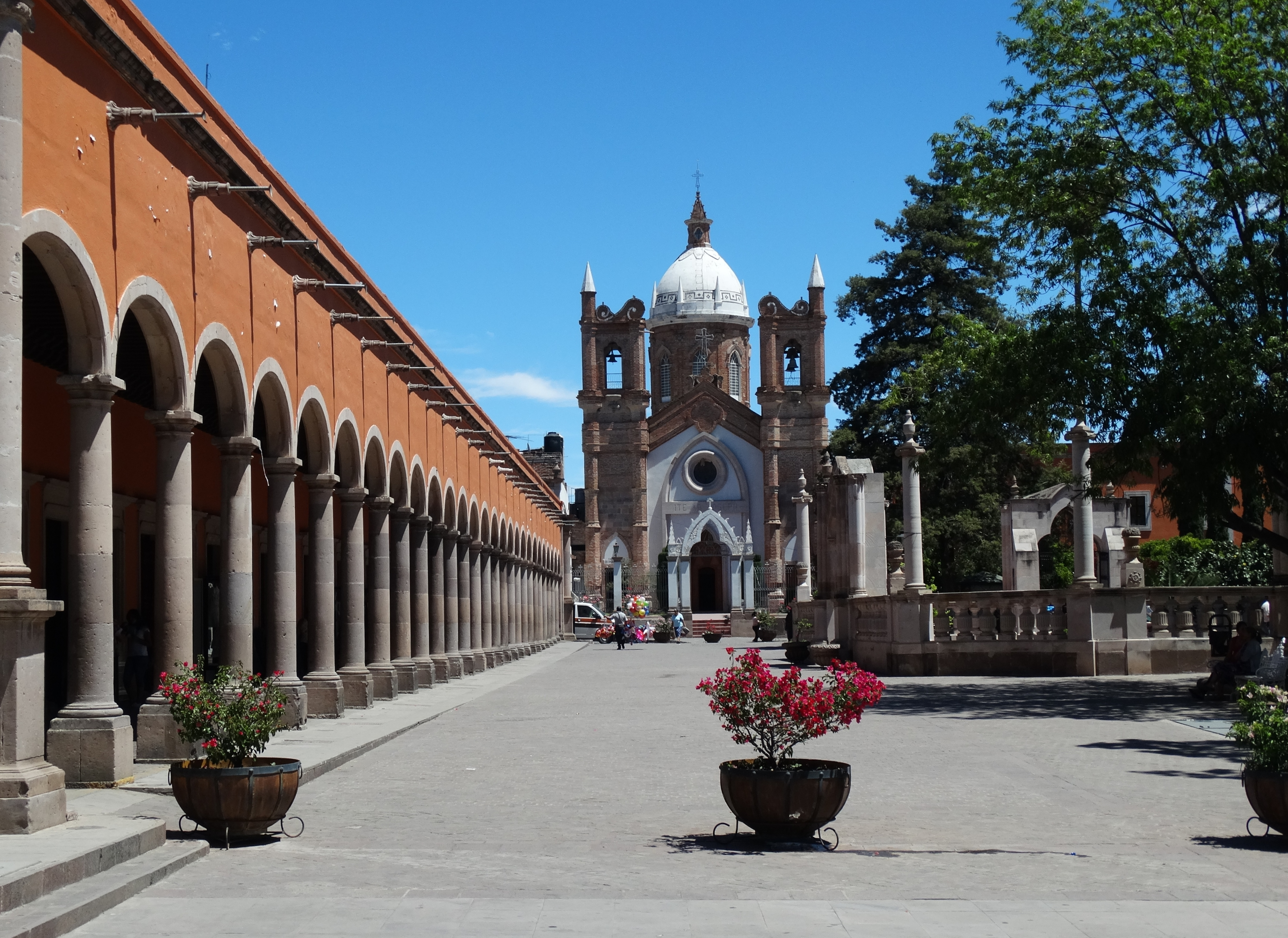
- Parián and Church of Nochistlán

- Location within Zacatecas Location within Mexico
- Coordinates: 21°21′38″N 102°50′46″W
- Country: Mexico
- State: Zacatecas
- Municipality: Nochistlán de Mejía

Government
  - Type: Ayuntamiento
  - Municipal President: Prof. Manuel Jimenez

Area
  - Total: 877.05 km^{2} (338.63 sq mi)

Population (2010)
  - Total: 27,932
  - Density: 31.8/km^{2} (82/sq mi)
  - Largest city: 16,562
- Time zone: UTC-6 (Central (US Central))
- Postal Code: 99900-99919
- Area code: 346
- Website: nochistlan.gob.mx

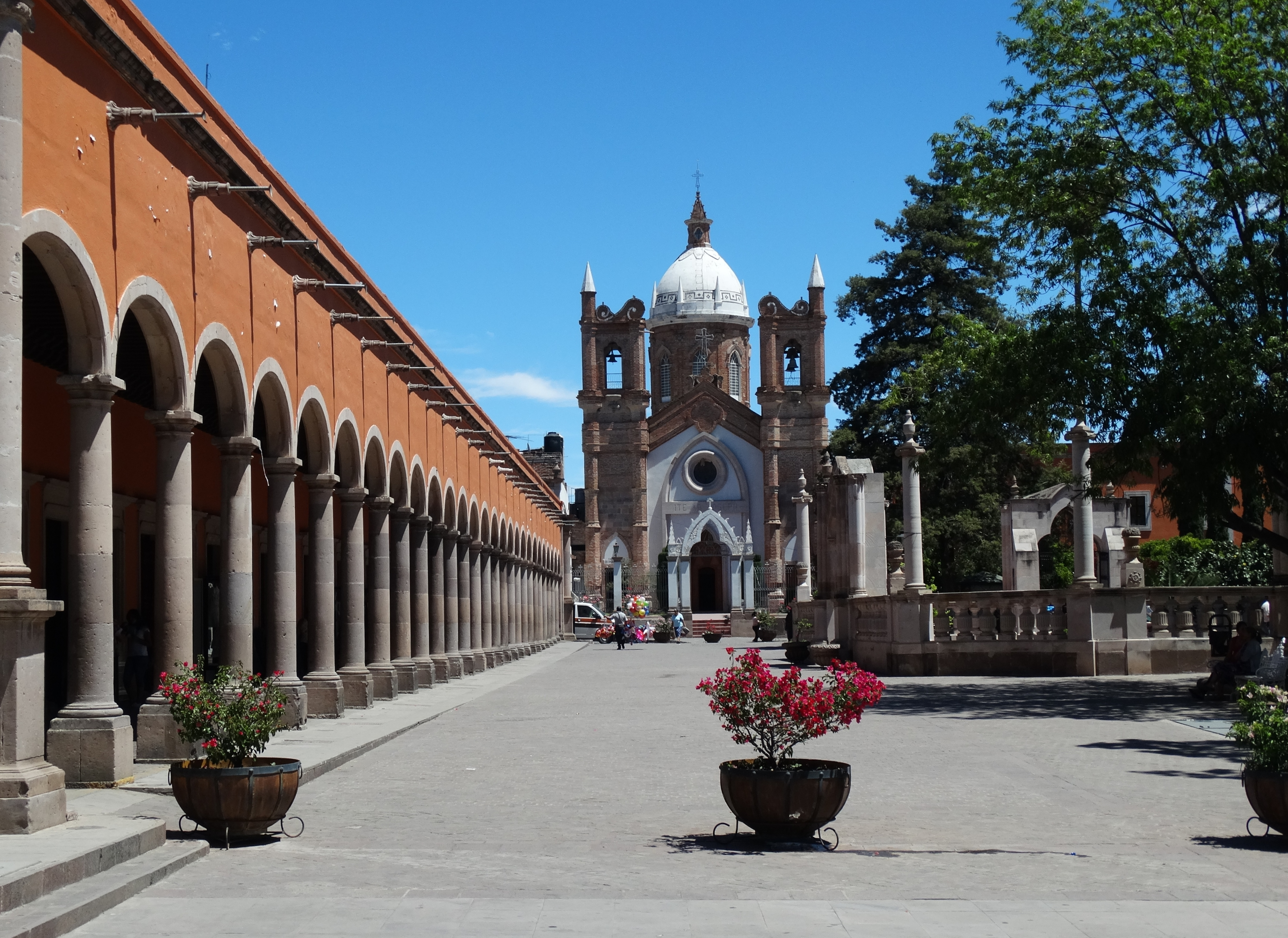
town centre

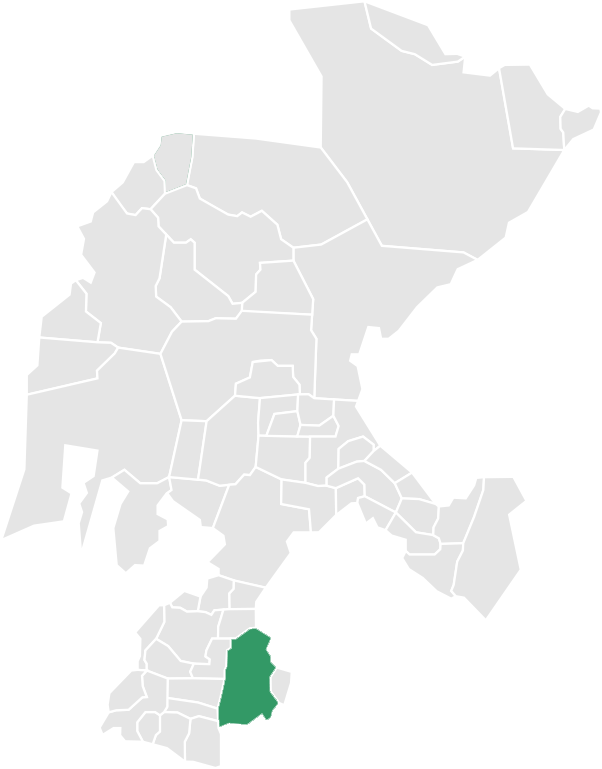
Nochistlán, Zacatecas

Nochistlán (Spanish pronunciation: [notʃisˈtlan]) (Nahuatl: Nocheztlan, "land of cochineal") is a city in the Mexican state of Zacatecas. Nuño Beltrán de Guzmán, on December 3, 1531, hired Cristóbal de Oñate to establish a village in Nochistlán; the village would be named Guadalajara to honor Guzmán for having been born in Guadalajara. Guadalajara was founded in Nochistlán on January 5, 1532. Its first officials were Cristóbal de Oñate, Sancho Ortiz de Zúñiga, Juan de Albornoz and Miguel de Ibarra. They worked at this project for only 16 months and created the first layout of Guadalajara.

The first news that we have regarding the natives of these lands points to the Tecuexe. These people established settlements around 1000. Later in the 12th century a new group of people moved in, these people were called Caxcan and they were from the valley in Tuitlán, which is now found in the municipality of Villanueva, Zacatecas. The Caxcan established Nochistlán (Señorío de Xic Conecan) by driving out the Tecuexe by force.

== Pueblo Magico ==
After its 481st anniversary of foundation, Nochistlan was named Pueblo Mágico or 'magic town' by the Secretary of Tourism (Mexico), Gloria Guevara Manzo. Nochistlán was the fifth town to be named Pueblo Mágico in the state of Zacatecas. To be nominated for this category, a town must have symbolic attributions, legends, history, significant cultural traditions, and attract tourists.

== Music ==
Nochistlán is known for its traditions as well as its music. It is also often referred to as, la tierra de los músicos ('the land of musicians'). Nochistlán has been given this nickname because within the town there is always music playing. In fact, Nochistlán's music is one of the main reasons tourists visit so much, aside from the beautiful architecture.

== Economy ==
There are 3 main activities that contribute to the economy: agriculture, livestock, and trade.

== Transportation ==
Nochistlán is a very rural place. Transportation is mostly on foot, since everything is within walking distance. Cars, buses, trucks, as well as horses are also used. "Combi vans" and motorcycles are especially popular modes of transport.

Most Nochistlan inhabitants live by nature. That is, most of their resources are native, making Nochistlan seem somewhat old-fashioned. In recent years the town has been modernizing its way of living.

== Traditions ==
=== El Papaqui ===
The oldest tradition in Nochistlán is la fiesta del Papaqui or translated, 'the party of el Papaqui'. This is celebrated every year from January 12 to January 20. El Papaqui is a celebration in which the whole town honors and venerates St. Sebastian.

== International relations ==
=== Twin towns – Sister cities ===
Nochistlán is twinned with:

- Guadalajara, Mexico

== Notable people ==
- Bernabé Meléndrez, action film star
- Perro Aguayo, professional wrestler

== See also ==
- Municipality of Nochistlán de Mejía

== Location ==
- Population 67,369
