= Apulco =

City in the Mexican state of Zacatecas

Apulco, Zacatecas
- City
- Location within Zacatecas Location within Mexico
- Coordinates: 21°23′N 102°40′W
- Country: Mexico
- State: Zacatecas
- Municipality: Apulco
- Founded: 1541(Fray Antonio de Segovia)

Government
  - Mayor: Martín Carvajal Mártinez
- Elevation: 1,840 m (6,040 ft)

Population (2005)
  - Total: 1,453
- Time zone: UTC-6 (Central (US Central))
- Postal code: 99922
- Area code: 346
- Website: apulco.gob.mx/portal/

Apulco is a city in the Mexican state of Zacatecas. The city serves as the administrative center for the surrounding municipality of Apulco. Apulco had a 2005 census population of 1,453 people.

== Origin of the name ==
The Nahuatl dictionary defines the word "Apoctli" (which people believe the name Apulco derived from) as smoke, water, water vapor.

== History ==
The first inhabitants of what is now Apulco were the Tecuexes who populated the area approximately in the 10th century. Later that area was inhabited by the Caxcan, which came from the Teuitlan Valley (now Municipality of Villanueva, Zacatecas), immediately a town arose which was known as Nochistlán, but they were expelled by its previous inhabitants, who later resided in the area due to the support of zacatecans and the Huachichil.

In the year of 1541, supported by the viceroy, Fray Antonio de Segovia moved forward with the Christian evangelization and built a chapel in favor of Saint Peter, patron of the place. Apulco was declared a town in 1821.
