= Cuauhtémoc Municipality, Zacatecas =

Cuauhtémoc
- Municipality
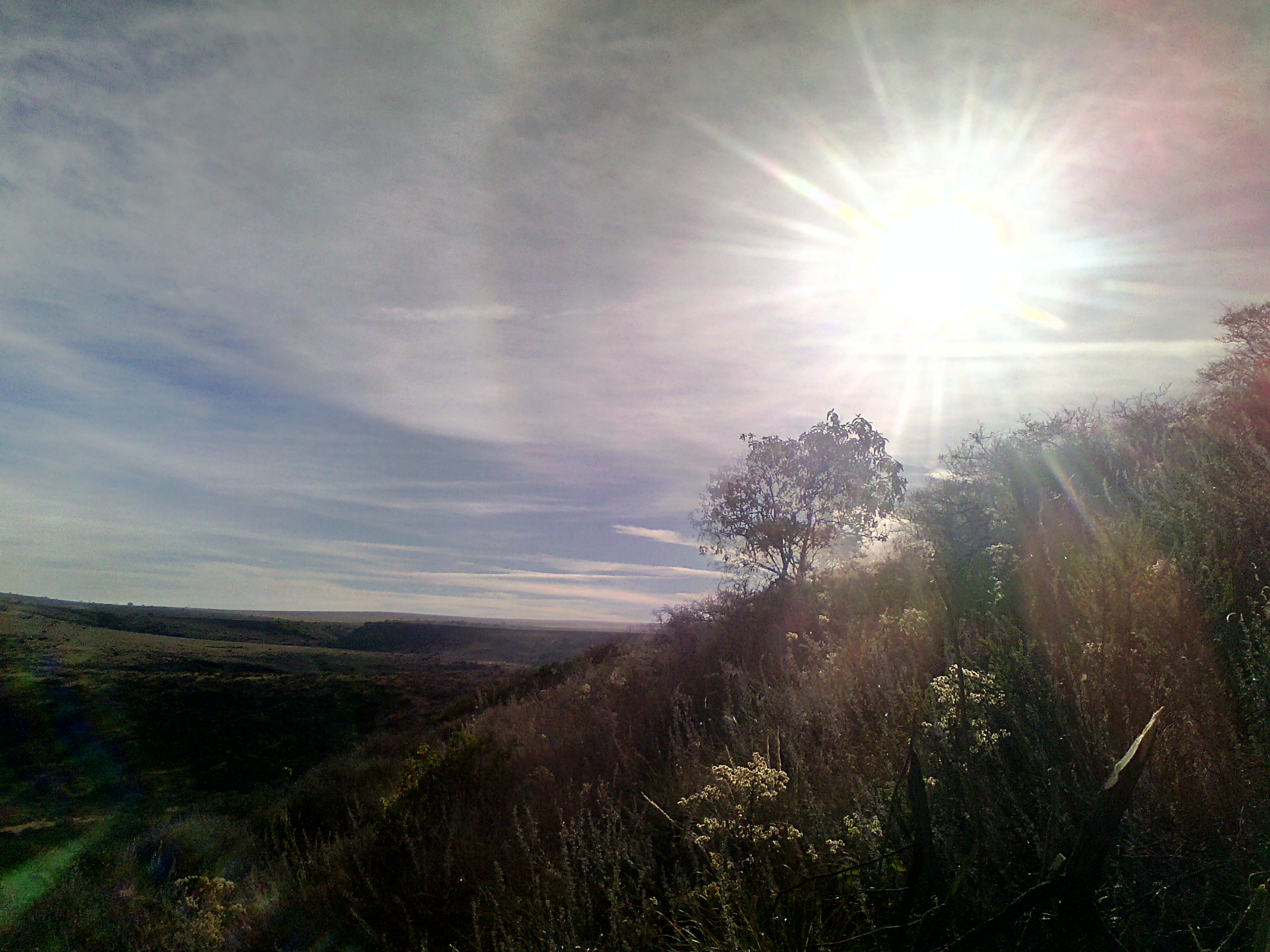
- Cuauhtémoc Municipality, Zacatecas, Mexico

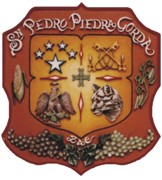
- Coat of arms

- Location of Cuauhtémoc Cuauhtémoc (Mexico)
- Coordinates: 22°27′N 102°21′W
- Country: Mexico
- State: Zacatecas
- Municipal seat: San Pedro Piedra Gorda
- Established: May 25, 1869

Government
  - Municipal President: Ángel Ruiz Zapata, PRD

Area
  - Total: 318 km^{2} (123 sq mi)
- Elevation: 2,030 m (6,660 ft)

Population (2005)
  - Total: 11,275
  - Seat: 7,701 San Pedro Piedra Gorda
- Time zone: UTC-6 (Central)
- Postal Code: 98691
- Area code: 458

Cuauhtémoc is one of the 58 municipalities in the Mexican state of Zacatecas. It is located in the central part of the state of Zacatecas and it is bounded by the municipalities of Ojocaliente, Luis Moya, and Genaro Codina; it also shares a border with the state of Aguascalientes. The municipality covers a total surface area of 318 square kilometers (123 sq mi).
