= Juan Carlos Regis Adame =

Mexican politician

- Born: 15 April 1967 (age 59); Villa de Cos, Zacatecas, Mexico
- Occupation: Politician
- Political party: PRD

Juan Carlos Regis Adame (born 15 April 1967) is a Mexican politician from the Party of the Democratic Revolution. From 2011 to 2012 he served as Deputy of the LXI Legislature of the Mexican Congress representing Zacatecas.
