= Huanusco =

- Municipality
- Location in Mexico Huanusco (Mexico)
- Country: Mexico
- State: Zacatecas
- Demonym: (in Spanish)
- Time zone: UTC−6 (CST)

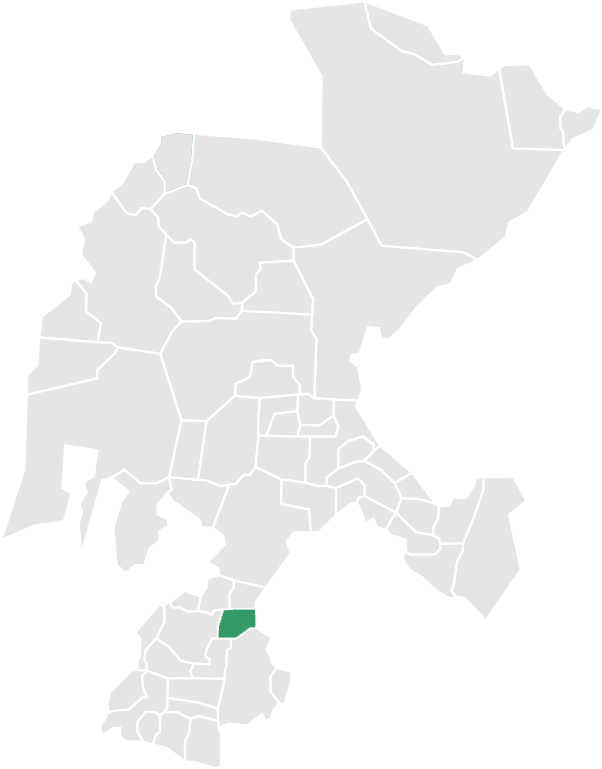
Location of Huanusco municipality in Zacatecas

The municipality and city of Huanusco is located in the southwestern portion of the Mexican state of Zacatecas.

Its coordinates are 21° 46' north latitude and 102° 58' west longitude. The average elevation of the municipality is 500 meters (1,625 feet) above sea level and the municipality covers an area of roughly 368 square kilometers (142 sq mi). The municipality is bordered on the north by the municipalities of Tabasco and General Joaquin Amaro, on the east by the municipality of Calvillo, Aguascalientes, on the south by the municipalities of Jalpa and on the west by the municipality of Tlaltenango De Sanchez Roman.

== Founding ==
Huanusco was founded shortly after the Mixtón War fought between 1540 and 1542 between the Caxcanes and other semi-nomadic Indigenous people of the area of north western Mexico against Spanish invaders, including their Aztec and Tlaxcalan allies. Huanusco is one of the municipalities located in the southwest of Zacatecas, in the region recognized as Juchipila Canyon. Leobardo Viramontes Flores, deputy chronicler of the municipality, tells us, in historical notes of Huanusco, that there are vestiges that during the pre-Hispanic era, members of the Caxcan tribe (of nomadic nature) spent long stays in the surroundings of what is now the municipal seat, in a place known as Las Liebres.

The name of the municipality has generated various discussions. In the book cited, Viramontes tells us that the place was originally known as Huanoch, which paid tribute to the chief of Metahuasco (Tabasco); there are also those who affirm that the word derives from Huataca, the last indigenous chief of the place; Huanol, son of Huataca or Huanoch, last priest of the tribe.

It has even been claimed that the name derives from <<Huaricho>>, which is a wild honeycomb that is abundant in the region, and that, previously, its inhabitants were called Huarichos. To date, no consensus has been reached on the meaning of the name, so it is preferable to give credit to the assistant and assistant chronicler of the municipality, who has access to sources of high historical value of the place. What Leobardo Viramontes confirms is that from 1600 it is already known as Huanusco.

During the colony, the municipality settled by Tlaxcaltecan Indians who were brought by Viceroy Antonio de Mendoza to replace the natives who were transferred to the Jalisco coast, because it represented a serious risk of insurrection. The few natives who remained hidden there will take a long time to engage in the usual work of the place, convinced after arduous talks by the Franciscan religious, who had been taught the mission to evangelize them.

Once again established and evangelized, the natives erected their capillary and were awarded La Purísima Concepción and San Francisco de Asís by patrons. Hence, the coat of arms of the municipality has, in addition to the garden and the building of the Municipal Palace with its archery, the effigies of an Indian in a fighting position and the face of the Saint of Assisi.

== Festivities ==
The book The municipalities of Zacatecas, belonging to the Encyclopedia Collection of the Municipalities of Mexico, indicates that within the popular festivities of the municipality of Huanusco are those held from September 28 to October 5, in honor of the Saint San Francisco de Asis; during these festivities serenades, pilgrimages, dances, quermeses, charreadas are celebrated, in addition pyro-technical games are launched, pyrotechnic games are installed, rooster tournaments are held and a cultural artistic program is developed with a variety of activities.

Some of the communities of the municipality also have their religious festivities:

- Mexiquito and La Higuera, January 12, celebrate the Virgin of Guadalupe
- Ciénega de Abajo, February 5, pay tribute to San Felipe de Jesús
- La Palma and Los Rodríguez, March 19, pay tribute to San Jose
- La Luz and El Remudadero, May 3, celebrate the Holy Cross
- Los Arellanos y los Soyates, May 15, hold a celebration in honor of San Isidro Labrador
- San Antonio de Oriente, June 13, worship San Antonio de Padua
- San Pedro Apóstol, June 29
- Guatimala, July 4, honor the Virgen del Refugio
- Ojo de Agua de las Flores, September 15, celebrate parties in honor of the Virgen de la Soledad
- Loma Larga, September 28, celebrate San Miguel Arcángel
- Yerbanis, December 8, celebrate the Purest Conception.

== Chronology ==
1709. It is founded as a brotherhood La Purisima by the illustrious bishop Don Diego Camacho.

1805. The first baptism certificate is recorded.

1869. Huanusco municipality is declared by Governor Victoriano Zamora.

1918. It is declared a free municipality, in congruence with the Constitution of 1917.

1935. The teachers Saul J. Maldonado and Maria Rodriguez Murillo are sacrificed by the cristeros.

== Emblematic Places ==
Temple of San Francisco de Asís. The most representative building of the municipality of Huanusco is, invariably, the temple erected to the Patron Saint Francisco de Asís, whose construction began in 1970. In his book The church of Huanusco, Leobardo Viramontes Flores, says that << the front [...] It is of the Tuscan order in its columns, as well as its altar, but Corinthian as far as Asis capitals are concerned. Currently the altar has been modified, for which part of the old one was destroyed, something that is regrettable since it should have been preserved as it was >>.

Other places. In addition to the municipal seat and the communities mentioned above, we find in Huanusco several tourist places such as the Dam and the Eye of Water, both on the banks of the Juchipila river as well as in the mountains that surround it, the Matrera Pile, Charco de la Campana, The Hillside of the Sálate; El Charco de las Figuras, Hot Springs in La Higuera and Los Ahuehuetes. The inconvenience to visit these sites is the lack of infrastructure and professional attention in the tourist field.

== Famous Characters ==
Calixto Medina Medina. This was Huanusco's first qualified doctor; He served as federal deputy and senator of the Republic. It was characterized by its high philanthropic and humanitarian spirit. The Jalpa hospital is named after him.

Bonifacio Villegas. This man was a soldier who participated in several combats; In 1920 he was appointed head of the committee in the land petition, which led him to the enmity of the landowners and cristeros of the region. He lost his life in a fight in Los Tepetates, in the Sierra de Morones.

Arturo Reyes Viramontes. He is a character who has numerous unpublished books (didactic, historical, anecdotal), which have served as a basis for shaping the history of Huanusco and Jalpa; that is, he was the first historian of these municipalities. He was also the initiator of the community museums of Jalpa and Huanusco, the first of which bears his name.

Jose Maria Benitez. This character is a writer. I collaborate in Excelsior and in the supplement “Mexican Magazine of Culture” of El Nacional. He was a teacher of literature, universal history and advertising. He was also a trade unionist and public official. Among his published works we find What my cat saw and other stories, belonging to the Debt Debt Collection, edited by the National Autonomous University of Mexico. In this work, María de Lourdes Franco Bagnouls, compiler of the stories, tells us the author: manages an extensive record of human behavior and condition, as well as the aesthetic orientations at his disposal; in the same way that it raises the most negative situations, it also reaches moments of extreme sublimity. His stories may or may not like a reader who is constantly attacked by the author but will recognize, no doubt in them the office exercised with skill and forcefulness.

== Gastronomy ==
Huanusco's food is diverse in colors, smells and flavors. Among the most representative dishes of the region and the municipality, we find the traditional pozole of red corn; there are also gorditas filled with curd, chilaquiles, chopped butter, red corn and tacazotas, which are tender corn gorditas; Red, deaf, green and sugar chili tamales; suegras or quesadillas of pumpkin flower, hitlacoche and jazpite; peanut atole, white, fat, abrojo and mesquite; red enchiladas, often, sweet and double mole, pipian, roast pork, tejuino, birria, pumpkin patties, mexquitamal, pumpkin seed hash, charrascas or charamuscas, corn soup, ponteduro, ozote mushroom stew, tea cuachalala, temachaca and pipitoria broth.
