= Santa María de la Paz =

- Municipality
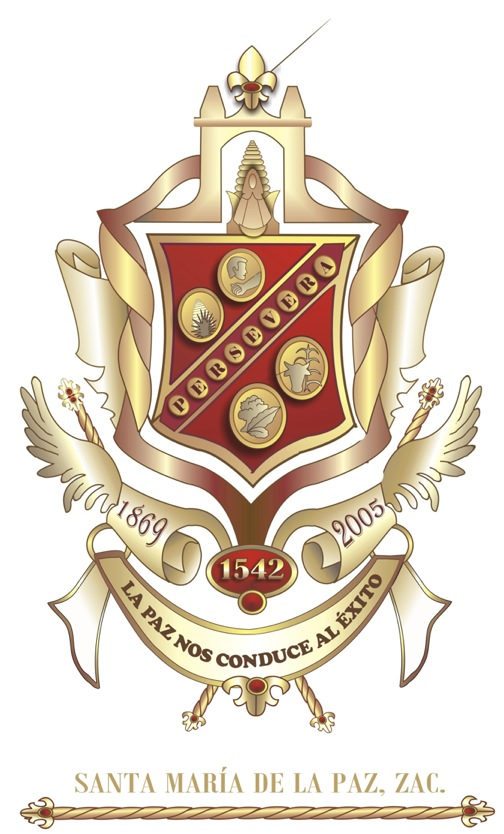
- Coat of arms

- Location of Santa María de la Paz Santa María de la Paz (Mexico)
- Coordinates: 21°30′42″N 103°24′22″W
- Country: Mexico
- State: Zacatecas
- Established: 1 January 2005
- Seat: Santa María de la Paz

Government
  - Municipal president: José Manuel González Dorado

Area
  - Total: 278.4 km^{2} (107.5 sq mi)
- Elevation (of seat): 1,922 m (6,306 ft)

Population (2020 Census)
  - Total: 2,767
  - Density: 9.939/km^{2} (25.74/sq mi)
  - Seat: 1,995
- Time zone: UTC-6 (Central)
- Postal codes: 99820–99828
- Area code: 467
- Website: Official website

Santa María de la Paz is a municipality in the Mexican state of Zacatecas, located approximately 165 kilometres (103 mi) southwest of the state capital of Zacatecas City.

== Geography ==
The municipality of Santa María de la Paz is located at an elevation between 1,800 and 2,700 metres (5,900–8,900 ft) in the Sierra Madre Occidental in southwestern Zacatecas. It borders the municipalities of Tepechitlán to the north, Jalpa to the northeast, Apozol to the east, Juchipila to the southeast, Teúl de González Ortega to the south, and Benito Juárez to the west. The municipality covers an area of 278.4 square kilometres (107.5 sq mi) and comprises 0.4% of the state's area.

As of 2009, 29.1% of the land in Santa María de la Paz is used for agriculture. The remainder of the land comprises forest (42.7%), grassland (27.7%), and grassland (0.4%). The municipality is situated in the drainage basin of the Río Grande de Santiago. Most of the municipality is drained by the Tlaltenango River, a tributary of the Bolaños River, while the eastern fifth of the municipality is drained by the Juchipila River. There is a small reservoir named El Izote located immediately east of the municipal seat.

Santa María de la Paz has a temperate climate with dry winters. Average temperatures in the municipality range between 14 and 20 °C (57–68 °F), and average annual precipitation ranges between 800 and 1,000 millimetres (31–39 in).

== History ==
After the Mixtón War, the friar Michele da Bologna founded the hospital of Nuestra señora de la Limpia Concepción c. 1542 at what is now Santa María de la Paz.

Santa María de la Paz was first established as a municipality in the partido of Tlaltenango from 1869 to 1905. It recorded a population of 2500 inhabitants in 1894. Afterwards it was subsumed under the municipality of Teúl, which changed its name to Teúl de González Ortega in 1935. The 1944 Zacatecas Constitution established the congregación of Ignacio Allende in Teúl de González Ortega. On 26 October 2004, the state government approved the reestablishment of the municipality of Santa María de la Paz from the congregación of Ignacio Allende, which took effect on 1 January 2005.

== Administration ==
The municipal government of Santa María de la Paz comprises a president, a councillor (Spanish: síndico), and seven trustees (regidores), four elected by relative majority and three by proportional representation. The current president of the municipality is José Manuel González Dorado.

== Demographics ==
In the 2020 INEGI census, Santa María de la Paz recorded a population of 2767 inhabitants living in 860 households. The 2010 Census recorded a population of 2821 inhabitants in Santa María de la Paz.

There are 19 inhabited localities in the municipality, of which only the municipal seat, also called Santa María de la Paz, is classified as urban. It recorded a population of 1995 inhabitants in the 2020 Census.

== Economy and infrastructure ==
The main economic activities in Santa María de la Paz are agriculture and cattle farming. The main crop grown is corn.

Federal Highway 23 runs north–south through the municipality, connecting it to Jerez and Fresnillo in the north, and Zapopan and Guadalajara in the south.
