= Juchipila =

- Municipality
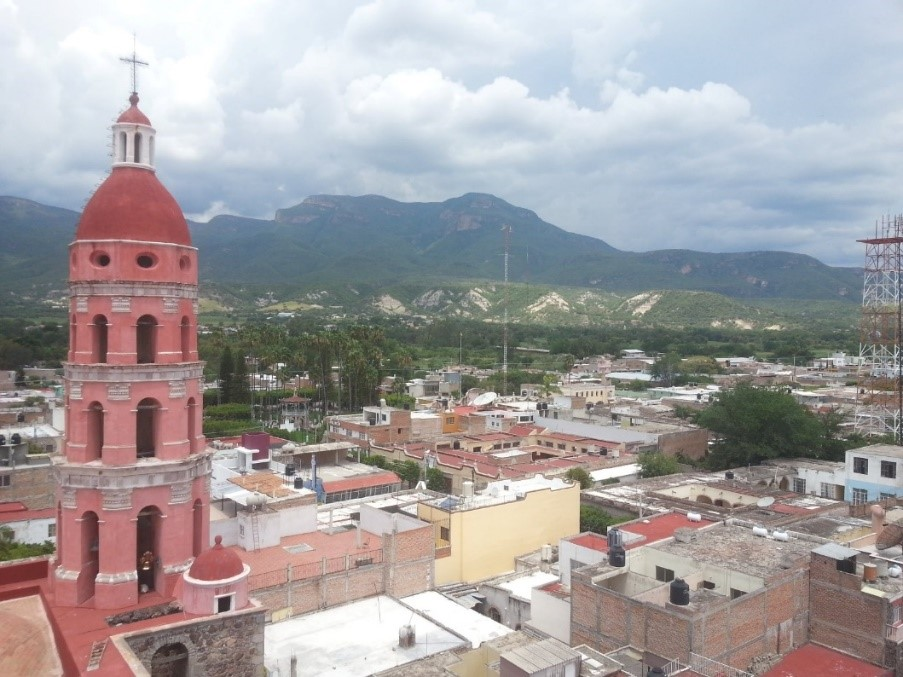
- View of the municipal seat of Juchipila. Behind the bell tower of the Church of Saint Francis of Assisi is the town plaza.

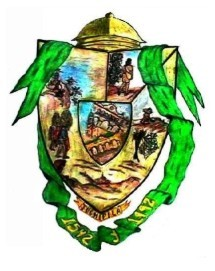
- Coat of arms

- Location of Juchipila Juchipila (Mexico)
- Coordinates: 21°24′37″N 103°07′03″W
- Country: Mexico
- State: Zacatecas
- Established: 17 January 1825
- Seat: Juchipila

Government
  - Municipal president: Jose Maria Castro Felix

Area
  - Total: 338.6 km^{2} (130.7 sq mi)
- Elevation (of seat): 1,249 m (4,098 ft)

Population (2020 Census)
  - Total: 12,251
  - Density: 36.18/km^{2} (93.71/sq mi)
  - Seat: 5,836
- Time zone: UTC-6 (Central)
- Postal codes: 99960–99979
- Area code: 467
- Website: Official website

Juchipila (Caxcan: Xuchipilan, "place of flowered nobles") is a municipality in the Mexican state of Zacatecas, located approximately 160 kilometres (99 mi) southwest of the state capital Zacatecas City.

== Geography ==
The municipality of Juchipila is located at an elevation between 1,800 and 2,700 metres (5,900–8,900 ft) in the Sierra Madre Occidental in southwestern Zacatecas. The municipality spans the canyon of the Juchipila River, a tributary of the Río Grande de Santiago, which is flanked by the Sierra de Morones to the west and the Sierra de Nochistlán to the east. The municipality borders the municipalities of Apozol to the north, Nochistlán de Mejía to the east, Moyahua de Estrada to the south, Mezquital del Oro to the southwest, Teúl de González Ortega to the west, and Santa María de la Paz to the northwest. The municipality covers an area of 338.6 square kilometres (130.7 sq mi) and comprises 0.4% of the state's area.

As of 2009, 15.8% of the land in Juchipila is used for agriculture. The remainder of the land cover consists of tropical dry forest (47.4%), temperate forest (28.9%), grassland (7.1%), and urban areas (0.7%).

Juchipila's climate ranges from semiarid in the Juchipila River canyon to temperate in the mountains surrounding it. Average temperatures in the municipality range between 14 and 24 °C (57–75 °F), and average annual precipitation ranges between 700 and 1,000 millimetres (28–39 in).

Climate data for Juchipila weather station at 21°24′17″N 103°06′51″W, 1259 m above sea level (1981–2010 averages, 1951–2010 extremes)
Month	Jan	Feb	Mar	Apr	May	Jun	Jul	Aug	Sep	Oct	Nov	Dec	Year
Record high °C (°F)	39.0 (102.2)	37.0 (98.6)	39.0 (102.2)	42.5 (108.5)	41.0 (105.8)	43.0 (109.4)	39.0 (102.2)	37.0 (98.6)	39.0 (102.2)	39.0 (102.2)	35.5 (95.9)	42.5 (108.5)	43.0 (109.4)
Mean daily maximum °C (°F)	25.9 (78.6)	28.7 (83.7)	31.2 (88.2)	33.6 (92.5)	35.4 (95.7)	34.1 (93.4)	30.4 (86.7)	30.3 (86.5)	29.9 (85.8)	29.8 (85.6)	28.4 (83.1)	26.8 (80.2)	30.4 (86.7)
Daily mean °C (°F)	15.4 (59.7)	17.6 (63.7)	19.7 (67.5)	22.3 (72.1)	24.8 (76.6)	25.5 (77.9)	23.3 (73.9)	23.1 (73.6)	22.5 (72.5)	21.1 (70.0)	18.2 (64.8)	16.2 (61.2)	20.8 (69.4)
Mean daily minimum °C (°F)	4.8 (40.6)	6.5 (43.7)	8.1 (46.6)	11.1 (52.0)	14.2 (57.6)	17.0 (62.6)	16.1 (61.0)	15.9 (60.6)	15.0 (59.0)	12.5 (54.5)	8.0 (46.4)	5.6 (42.1)	11.2 (52.2)
Record low °C (°F)	−5.0 (23.0)	−1.5 (29.3)	1.5 (34.7)	2.0 (35.6)	4.5 (40.1)	6.0 (42.8)	8.0 (46.4)	10.0 (50.0)	2.0 (35.6)	1.0 (33.8)	−2.5 (27.5)	−3.0 (26.6)	−5.0 (23.0)
Average precipitation mm (inches)	21.7 (0.85)	11.4 (0.45)	3.1 (0.12)	1.6 (0.06)	19.5 (0.77)	116.4 (4.58)	200.6 (7.90)	170.8 (6.72)	99.2 (3.91)	36.7 (1.44)	9.9 (0.39)	6.9 (0.27)	697.8 (27.47)
Average rainy days (≥ 1 mm)	2.0	1.4	0.5	0.3	3.0	10.5	17.1	16.3	10.1	4.8	1.3	1.6	68.9
Source: Servicio Meteorológico Nacional

== History ==
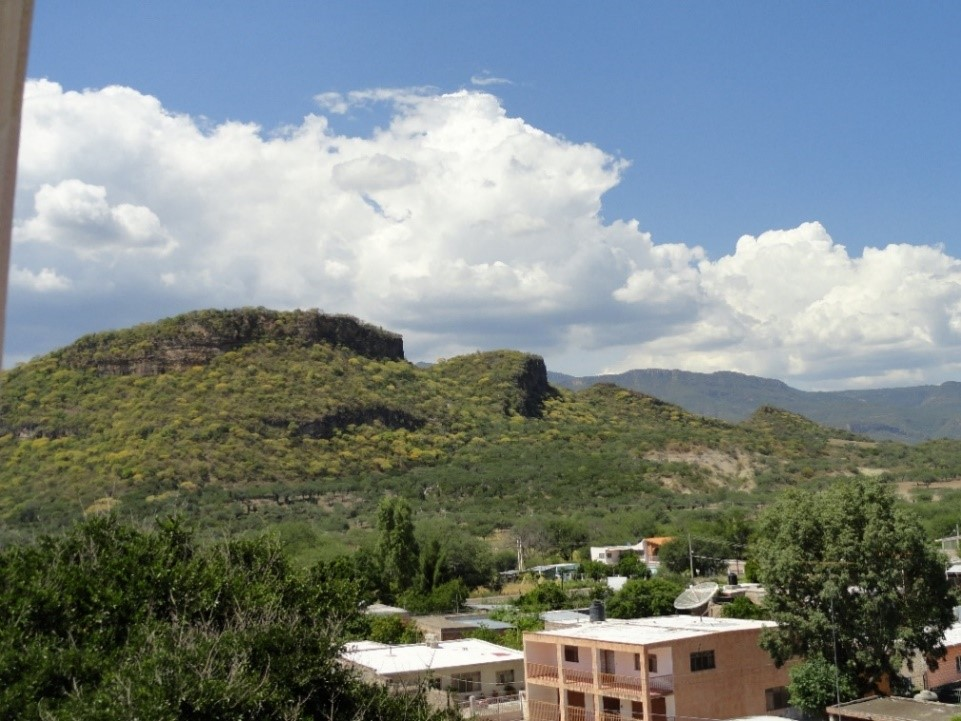
Cerro de las Ventanas, location of the archaeological site of Las Ventanas, as viewed from the town of Juchipila.

Prior to Spanish contact, Juchipila was a Caxcan taxtukayul called the Señorío de Juchipila in Spanish sources. The Caxcanes had invaded the area in the 13th century from Tuitlán, now known as La Quemada.

The archaeological site of Las Ventanas, also known as the Peñol de Juchipila, is located next to the village of El Remolino, 5 kilometres (3.1 mi) south of the municipal seat of Juchipila. Structures at the site date from the late Classic and Postclassic periods, and other structural and archaeological remains indicate inhabitation as early as the first centuries AD. Las Ventanas was one of the most heavily fortified of ancient Mesoamerican sites. Its upper citadel, set above sheer cliffs and accessible only by a steep and narrow stairway with switchbacks, features some of the finest stonework of its kind in all of Mesoamerica. Beneath the citadel is a settlement zone covering more than 25 hectares (62 acres).

Xiuhtecuhtli, the leader of Juchipila, was based at Las Ventanas (then known as Tlatlan or Tlaltan) when the Spanish first arrived in the area around 1530–1531. He and other Caxcan leaders led a vigorous resistance to Spanish colonization attempts throughout the 1530s, until the Spanish finally prevailed in the Mixtón War of 1540–1542.

Franciscan friars founded the first monastery in what is now the town of Juchipila around 1532. The church of St. Francis of Assisi, the first built in the region and one of the first in Nueva Galicia, dates to 1627.

From 1548 to 1786, Juchipila was designated an alcaldía mayor of Nueva Galicia, its territory extending from Villaneuva in the north to Moyahua in the south. It then became a subdelegacíon under the Intendancy of Guadalajara until 1804, when it was transferred along with Aguascalientes to the Intendancy of Zacatecas.

After Mexican independence, Juchipila became of the original eleven partidos in the 1825 Constitution of Zacatecas, losing its eastern territories to Aguascalientes and its northern territories to the new partido of Villanueva. The partido of Nochistlán was separated from Juchipila in 1852. When partidos were abolished in 1916, Juchipila was divided into the municipalities of Apozol, Juchipila proper, Moyahua, and Mezquital del Oro.

== Administration ==
The municipal government of Juchipila comprises a president, a councillor (Spanish: síndico), and ten trustees (regidores), six elected by relative majority and four by proportional representation. The current president of the municipality is Jose Maria Castro Felix.

== Demographics ==
In the 2020 INEGI census, Juchipila recorded a population of 12,251 inhabitants living in 3888 households. The 2010 Census recorded a population of 12,284 inhabitants in Juchipila.

There are 30 inhabited localities in the municipality, of which only the municipal seat, also called Juchipila, is classified as urban. It recorded a population of 5836 inhabitants in the 2020 census.

Juchipila and its neighbouring municipalities have experienced high rates of emigration to the United States since the second half of the 20th century.

== Culture and education ==
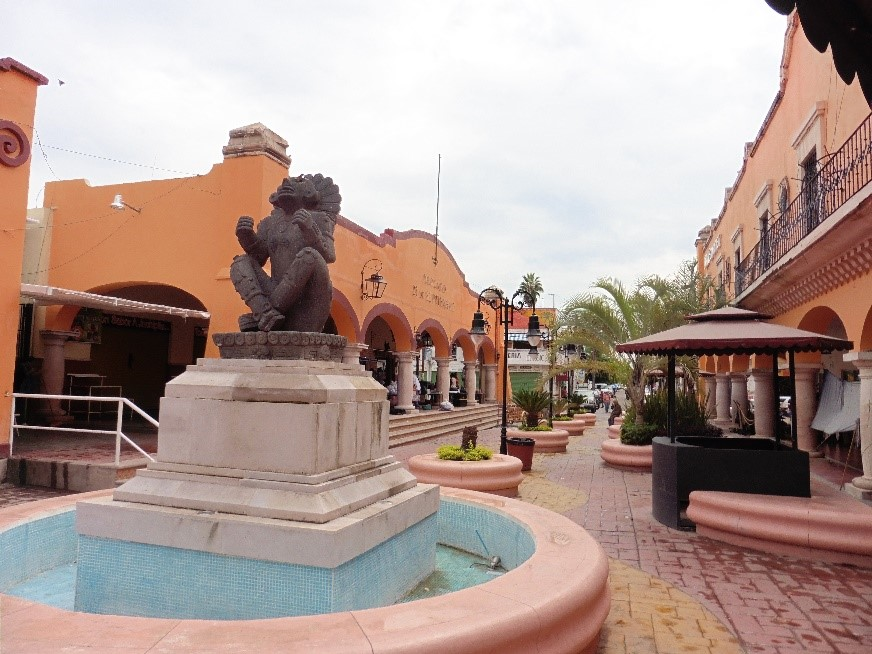
Statue of Xochipilli in front of the Mercado 27 de septiembre in the municipal seat of Juchipila.

The oldest festival in Juchipila is the Fiesta de Xúchitl, celebrated in June on the eve of the octave of Corpus Christi. The tradition has pre-Hispanic roots and was originally dedicated to Xōchipilli, the god of flowers, music, song and dance, being celebrated near the summer solstice and at the onset of the wet season. It was declared intangible cultural heritage of the state of Zacatecas in 2015. Another notable festival celebrated in Juchipila is the Festival of the Tastoanes, held sometime around the feast day of Saint James at the end of July.

The first investigations of the archaeological site of Cerro de Las Ventanas were made by Aleš Hrdlička, who visited the site in 1898 and 1902. The site was opened to the public in August 2019, although it was closed during the COVID-19 pandemic.

The Polytechnic University of Southern Zacatecas (Universidad Politécnica del Sur de Zacatecas, UPSZ) is located in the village of El Remolino just south of the municipal seat of Juchipila.

== Economy and infrastructure ==
The main economic activities in Juchipila include commerce, services, agriculture and cattle farming. Important crops grown include corn, ornamental plants, and agave. Remittances from the United States also form a large part of the municipality's income.

Federal Highway 23 runs north–south through the municipality, connecting it to Jerez and Fresnillo in the north, and to Zapopan and Guadalajara in the south.
