= Apulco Municipality =

Municipality in the Mexican state of Zacatecas

Municipality of Apulco
- Municipality
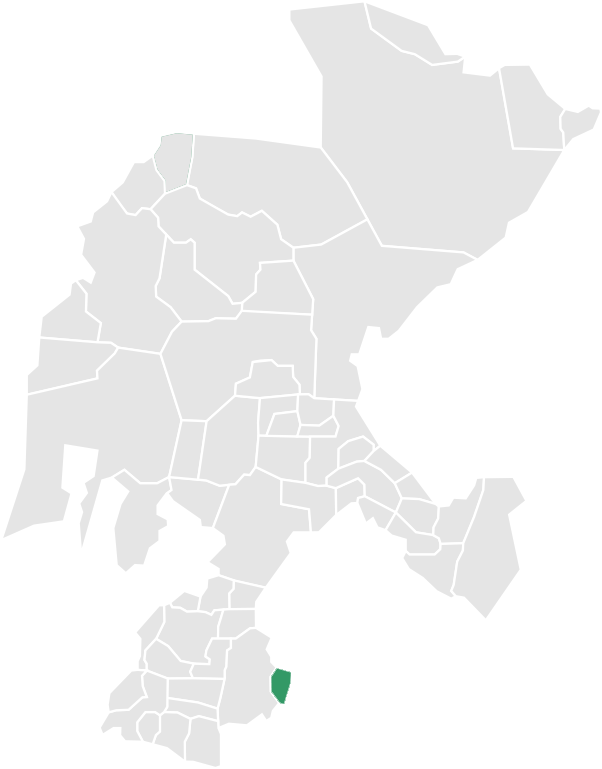
- Interactive map of Municipality of Apulco
- Coordinates: 21°23′N 102°40′W
- Country: Mexico
- State: Zacatecas
- Municipality: Apulco
- Largest city: Tenayuca
- Founded: 1541 (Fray Antonio de Segovia)
- Municipality: 1863

Government
  - Municipal President: Martín Carvajal Mártinez, PRD

Area
  - Total: 200 km^{2} (77 sq mi)
- Elevation: 1,850 m (6,070 ft)

Population (2005)
  - Total: 4,801
  - Largest city: 1,791 Tenayuca
- Time zone: UTC-6 (Central (US Central))
- Postal Code: 99920, 99921, 99922, 99925, 99930
- Area code: 467

Apulco is one of the 58 municipalities in the Mexican state of Zacatecas. It is located in the southern part of the state of Zacatecas and it is bounded by the municipality of Nochistlán de Mejía. The municipality covers a total surface area of 200 square kilometers (77 sq mi).

The municipal seat is the city of Apulco.

== Population ==
In the 2005 census Apulco reported a population of 4,801. Of these, 1,453 lived in the municipal seat and the remainder in surrounding rural communities.
