= Monte Escobedo =

Coordinates: 22°18′N 103°34′W

Monte Escobedo, Zacatecas
- Town
- Monte Escobedo
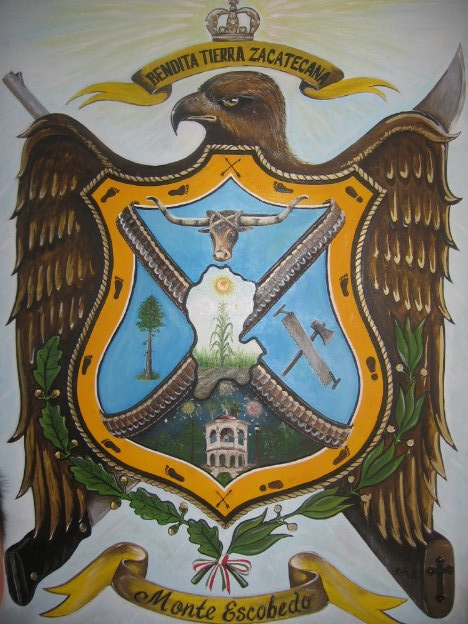
- Coat of arms

- Location within Zacatecas Location within Mexico
- Country: Mexico
- State: Zacatecas
- Municipality: Monte Escobedo
- Founded: 1705

Government
  - Municipal president: Manuel Acosta Galván
- Elevation: 2,120 m (6,960 ft)

Population (2020)
  - Town: 8,683
  - Urban: 4,247
  - Demonym: Monteescobedense
- Time zone: UTC-6 (Central (US Central))
- Postal code: 99400

Monte Escobedo is a municipality and town located in the southwestern area of the Mexican state of Zacatecas. With a total population of 8683 people.

== History ==
The municipality-titled was given in 1820, when the Cortes of Cádiz in Spain was established. The Township was named as Francisco de Escobedo y Díaz, an early settler of the town. It's the seat of the Monte Escobedo municipality.

== Delictive issues ==
The last police officer of Monte Escobedo disappeared on January 19, 2021. Two police officers resigned in December 2020; in 2013 there were 22 officers. The municipality is now completely controlled by the Jalisco New Generation Cartel (CJNG).

The town’s mayor, Ramiro Sánchez, facing pressure from both warring factions, was pressured to allocate municipal resources such as ambulances for cartel-related conflicts. Due to security threats, he and his family fled to the United States, where he continued governing remotely until 2022. He has since returned to Monte Escobedo with his family and has faced no apparent danger.
