= Tepetongo =

Coordinates: 22.45813°N 103.15136°W

- Municipality
- Location of Tepetongo Tepetongo (Mexico)
- Country: Mexico
- State: Zacatecas
- Established: 1823
- Seat: Tepetongo

Area
  - Total: 715 km^{2} (276 sq mi)
- Time zone: UTC−6 (Central)

The municipality of Tepetongo is located in the southwestern portion of the Mexican state of Zacatecas. It is a town on the border between Zacatecas and Jalisco. It is next to Huejucar and Jerez de García Salinas

== Population ==
The population varies from year to year increasing or decreasing but always hovering around 20,000 including those of surrounding villages and ranches. While the area itself once had a large native American population it is now mostly composed of mixed Spanish and native stock. The Spanish, in particular, had a large imprint as late as the 19th century, and many local families can still trace their ancestral lines back several centuries and many to Spain and even some to specific Spanish towns, much like nearby cities such as Jerez de Garcia Salinas. Much of this is apparent in its religious as well as everyday practices such as ranching, cattle raising, and animal husbandry in general (pigs, beef, chickens) as well as the agricultural practices and many of its traditions like the jaripeo (what is commonly known as the rodeo in the U.S. where a participant will try to stay atop a bucking bull), and what is a formal rodeo, an event of larger importance but also exclusivity as many of these events are sometimes invitation only, they often need their own horses, or borrow one, and one needs to pay fees per head of cattle (the event consists of a rider atop a horse chase a young bull or cow, and in the more difficult events, larger bulls, and try to topple it by its tail as the rider comes up on the side). These types of events are usually hosted by an individual who has enough cattle at the time to use, or by a group of people who pool their resources to bring the event about. The winners who topple the buck atop their steed are rewarded with either money and a ribbon by the events honorary queens, a cash prize, or both. The rodeos are hosted quite frequently year-round in various villages nearby or near the town itself, but especially during the town festivities in June. As mentioned earlier, religion is a very important part of customs and many holidays and customs are closely followed. As are ordinances coming down from the Vatican and the Catholic dioceses. Solís is the diocesan priest currently.

== History ==
The town of Tepetongo, located in the municipality of the same namesake, was founded several years after Jerez de Garcia Salinas (16th century AD) was established for a second time, a few kilometers down the road. The town proper is nestled in a valley surrounded by hills (where the local cemetery is located), villages, and numerous ranches. The town, much like the state has its economy grounded in agriculture. Most of its citizens work on nearby land in some way or another (own land, cattle). The town also draws a large portion of its population from nearby villages such as El Salitral, El Salitre, San Antonio, El Salitrillo, Juanchorrey, La Estancia De Los Berumen, La Troje, El Capulin, El Vergel, Los Aparicio, Susticacan, La Joya, Santa Rosa, and La Tinaja among many others as well as former haciendas such as Viboras and Buenavista. The town and its surroundings were frequent routes and stopovers for the various revolutionary groups during the Mexican Revolution, and left much of an imprint on its history much like the larger conflicts that took place in the capital of the state itself of Zacatecas. The town much like the state, has a long history of religious tradition that extends to its buildings, its culture, and customs. Nearly every village has at least one well kept chapel, and the town itself has a large Gothic church in which ceremonies are held year round, but the largest festivities take place around the holiday of San Juan Bautista (St. John the Baptist) on June 24. The festival draws in people from surrounding villages and towns (Huejucar, Jerez), and more recently from expatriates living abroad mostly in the U.S., but Europe as well and their children and grandchildren. The towns population swells to several times its size around this time of year. The festival itself is marked by a mass, reenactments, religious processions during the day, rodeo events, a fair, and a general nightclub/bar atmosphere and people watching later in the night, albeit with men (and increasingly women) roaming the streets on horseback all coming to a climax with its large tower of fireworks (known as polvoras, and castillos) display, rain notwithstanding every few years.

== Sources ==
- Enciclopedia de los Municipios de Zacatecas, State of Zacatecas
- Insituto Nacional de Estadística, Geografía e Informática
