= Momax =

Town in the Mexican state of Zacatecas

Momax, Zacatecas
- Town
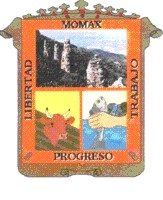
- Coat of arms

- Location in Mexico Momax, Zacatecas (Mexico)
- Coordinates: 21°56′0″N 103°19′0″W
- Country: Mexico
- State: Zacatecas
- Municipality: Momax

Government
  - Mayor: Geno Miramontes (PRI)

Area
  - Total: 0.976 km^{2} (0.377 sq mi)
- Elevation: 1,654 m (5,427 ft)

Population (2010)
  - Total: 1,626
- Time zone: UTC−6 (CST)
- Postal code: 99720
- Website: Official website

Momax is a small town located in the state of Zacatecas, Mexico. It is the administrative seat of the municipality of Momax.

== Overview ==
It is not known when the town of Momax was formed, but because of papers localized at Mexico's "Archivo General de la Nacion", it is believed that the area surrounding the city was first populated during 1591 by Don Luis de Velasco, who took 400 male Indians, their women and children from Tlaxcala to an area known as "Chichimeca Zone", from where Miguel Caldera took 40 families to Colotlan, Jalisco, then choosing 7 families from those 40 and taking them, in 1592, to the area now known as Momax.
