= Apozol Municipality =

Municipality in the Mexican state of Zacatecas

Municipality of Apozol
- Municipality
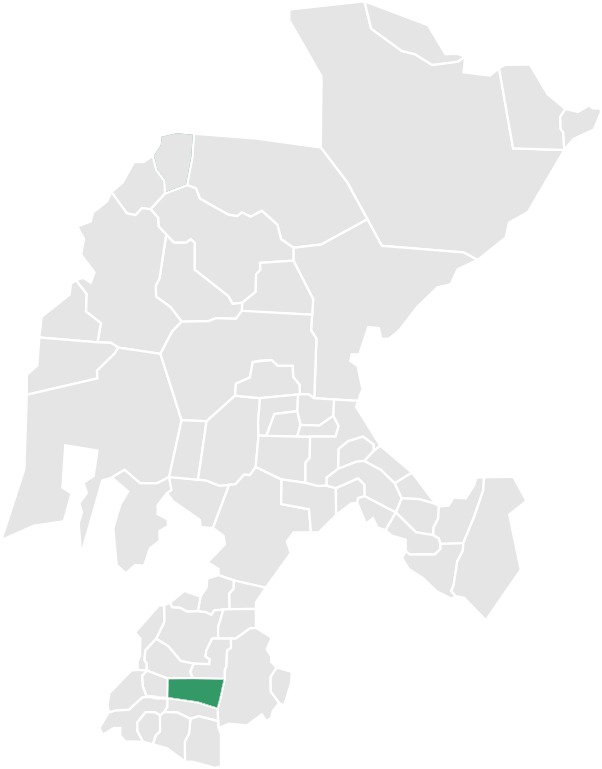
- Location of Apozol within Zacatecas and Mexico
- Coordinates: 21°28′N 103°5′W
- Country: Mexico
- State: Zacatecas
- Municipal seat: Apozol
- Largest city: Apozol
- Founded: December 1541 (Cristóbal de Oñate)
- Municipality: 1863

Government
  - Municipal President: Joaquín Robles González PRI

Area
  - Total: 283 km^{2} (109 sq mi)
- Elevation: 1,300 m (4,300 ft)

Population (2005)
  - Total: 5,898
  - Largest city: 2,912
- Time zone: UTC-6 (Central (US Central))
- Postal Code: 99961
- Area code: 467

Apozol is one of the 58 municipalities in the state of Zacatecas, Mexico.

It is located in the southern part of the state of Zacatecas and is bounded by the municipalities of Jalpa, Juchipila, Nochistlán de Mejía, Tepechitlán and Teúl de González Ortega.

The municipality covers a total surface area of 283 square kilometers (109 sq mi). The 2005 census reported a population of 5,898. The municipality accounts for 0.68% of the area of the state of Zacatecas.
