= Loreto, Zacatecas =

Coordinates: 22°16′00″N 101°59′00″W

Loreto
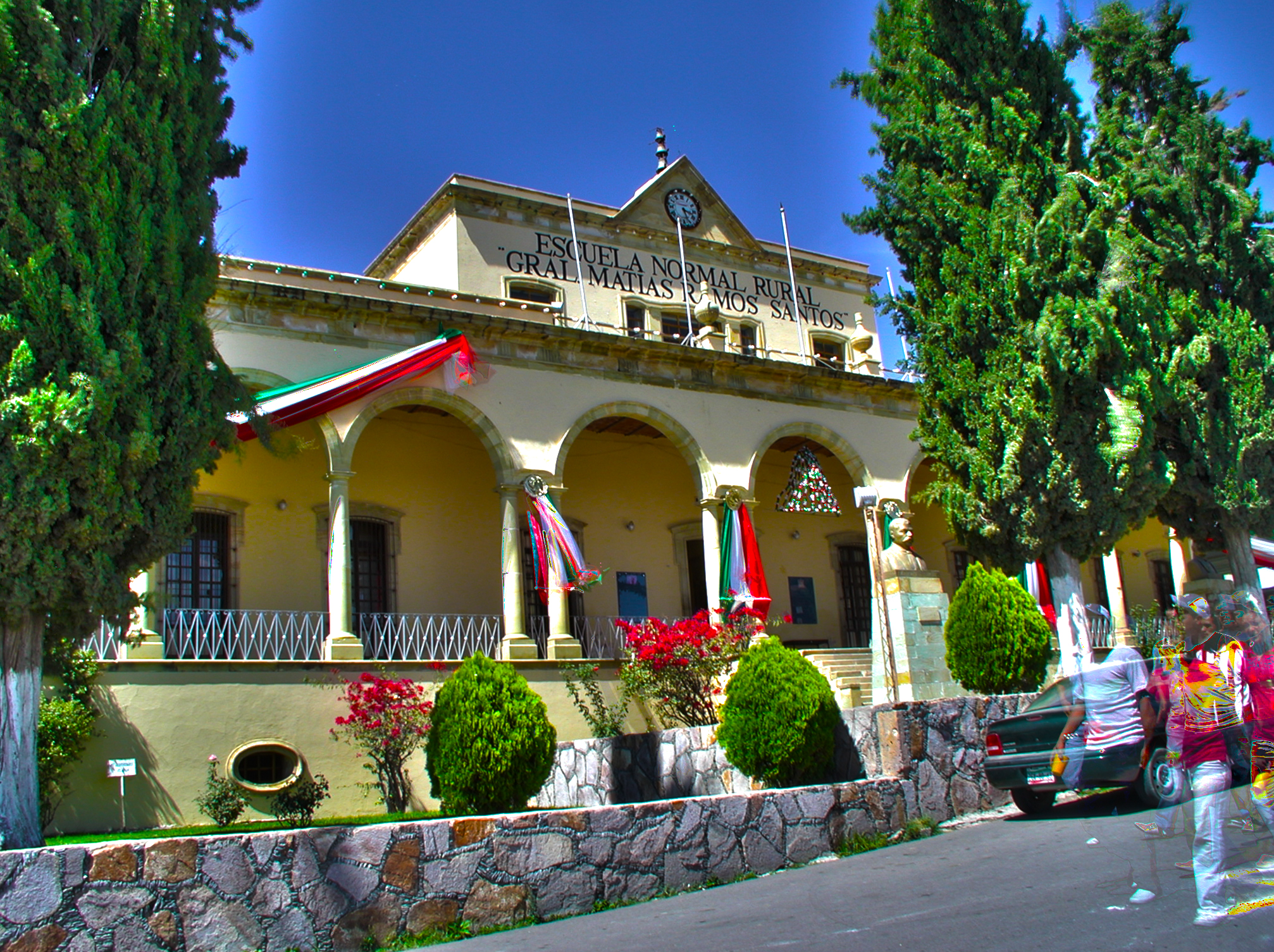
- Escuela Normal Rural "Gral. Matías Ramos Santos" (Rural Normal School "General Matías Ramos Santos) in Loreto

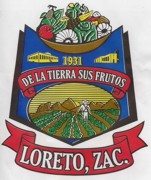
- Coat of arms

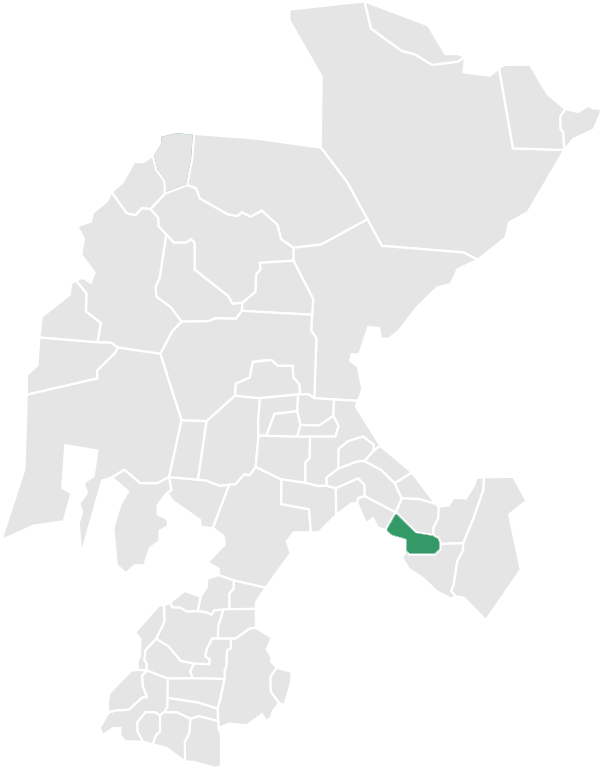
- Loreto in Zacatecas
- Country: Mexico
- State: Zacatecas

Population (2005)
  - Total: 43,411

Loreto is a town and municipality in the state of Zacatecas, Mexico. The town is the seventh-largest community in the state, with a 2005 census population of 22,085 inhabitants, while the municipality of which it serves as municipal seat had a population of 43,411. The municipality has an area of 427 km^{2} (164.87 sq mi).

People celebrate Nuestra Señora de Loreto from 1 to 10 December. It is an agricultural region where people grow primarily lettuce, corn, chiles, and beans. This town was founded in 1931 with the name Bimabaletes, and in 1956 its official name changed to Loreto.

It is home to the well known regional band Los 5 de Zacatecas.

== Notable people ==
- Jesús Aceves, known for having the rare condition hypertrichosis
