= Tabasco, Zacatecas =

Tabasco
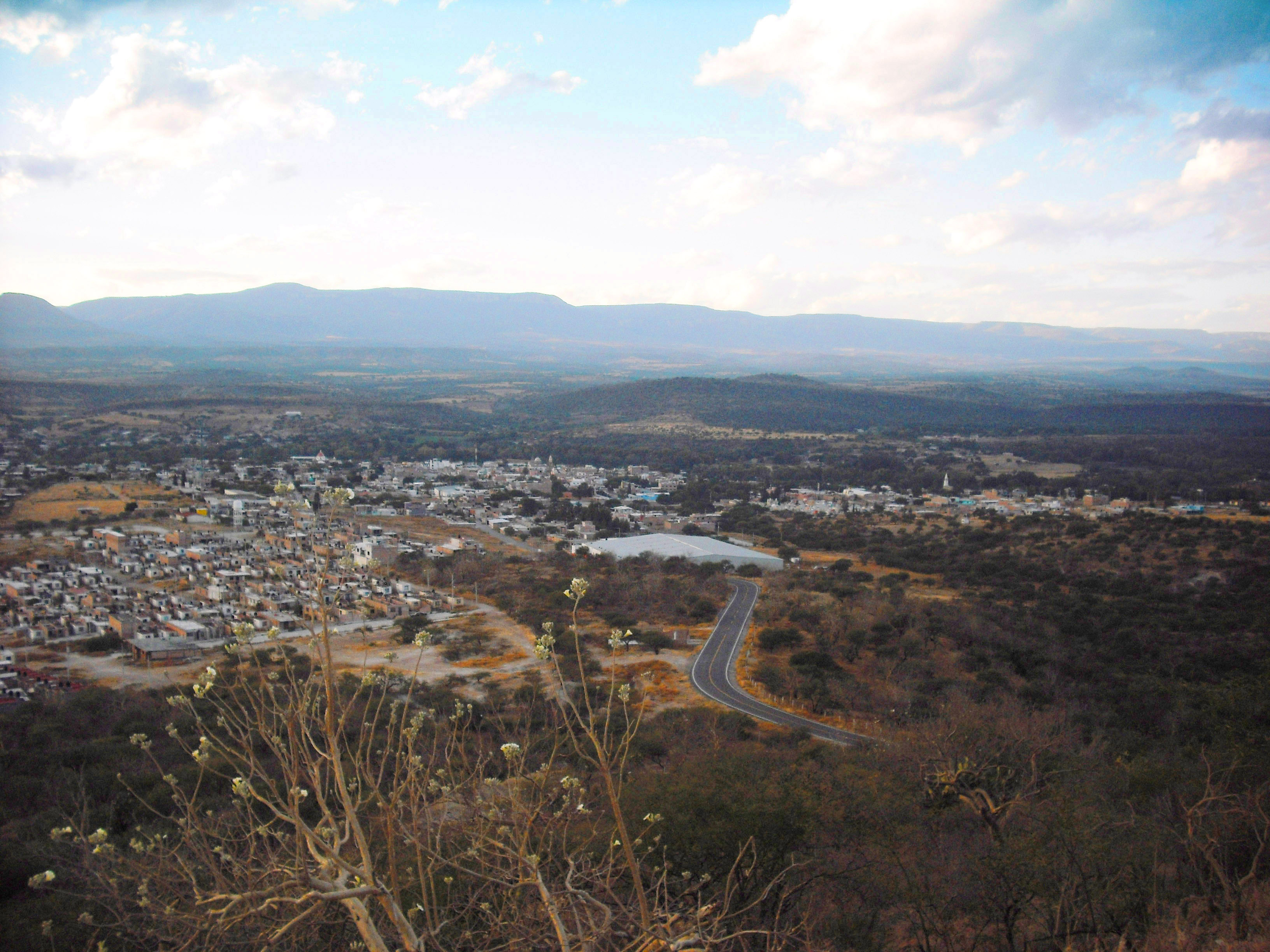
- Interactive map of Tabasco
- Coordinates: 21°52′N 102°55′W
- Country: Mexico
- State: Zacatecas
- Municipality: Tabasco
- Founded: 1543–50

Tabasco is a small town in the state of Zacatecas, Mexico.

== Tabasco Municipality ==
The town of Tabasco is the municipal seat of Tabasco Municipality.

On 9 April 2023, a 31 m (102 ft) tall statue of Jesus Christ was inaugurated atop the Cerrito de la Fe in Tabasco Municipality. The monument, officially titled El Cristo de la Paz (The Christ of Peace), is the tallest sculpture of Jesus Christ in Latin America, being a meter taller than the Cristo Redentor (not including pedestal).
