= Nochistlán de Mejía Municipality =

Municipality in the Mexican state of Zacatecas

Nochistlán de Mejía Nochistlán
- Municipality
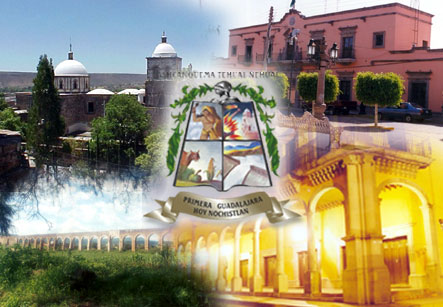
- Coat of arms

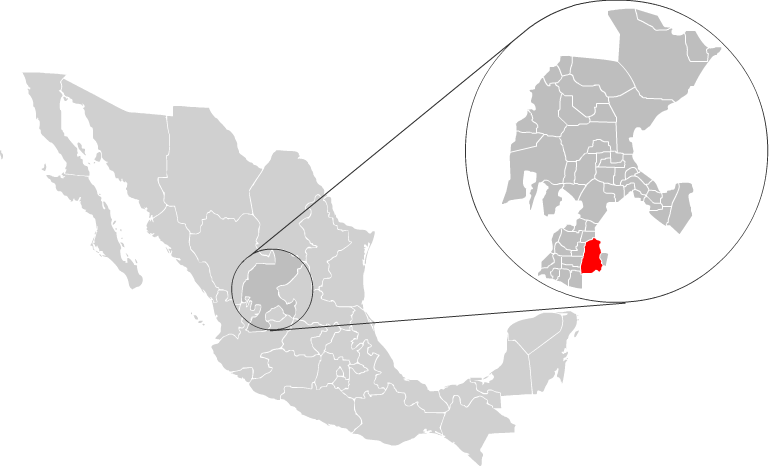
- Location of Nochistlán within Zacatecas and Mexico
- Coordinates: 21°48′03″N 102°45′57″W
- Country: Mexico
- State: Zacatecas
- Municipal seat: Nochistlán de Mejía
- Largest city: Nochistlán
- Villa de Guadalajara (When settled by Spaniards): December 3, 1531
- Founded Municipality: 1825
- Heroic defense against the French: May 13, 1864

Government
  - Type: Ayuntamiento
  - Municipal President: C. José Manuel Jiménez Fuentes

Area
  - Total: 877.05 km^{2} (338.63 sq mi)

Population (2020)
  - Total: 27,945
  - Density: 31.8/km^{2} (82/sq mi)
  - Largest city: 16,562
- Time zone: UTC-6 (Central (US Central))
- Postal Code: 99900-99919
- Area code: 346
- Website: nochistlan.gob.mx

Nochistlán is one of the 58 municipalities in the Mexican state of Zacatecas. Founded by the Caxcanes, it was also the first site of Guadalajara in Mexico.

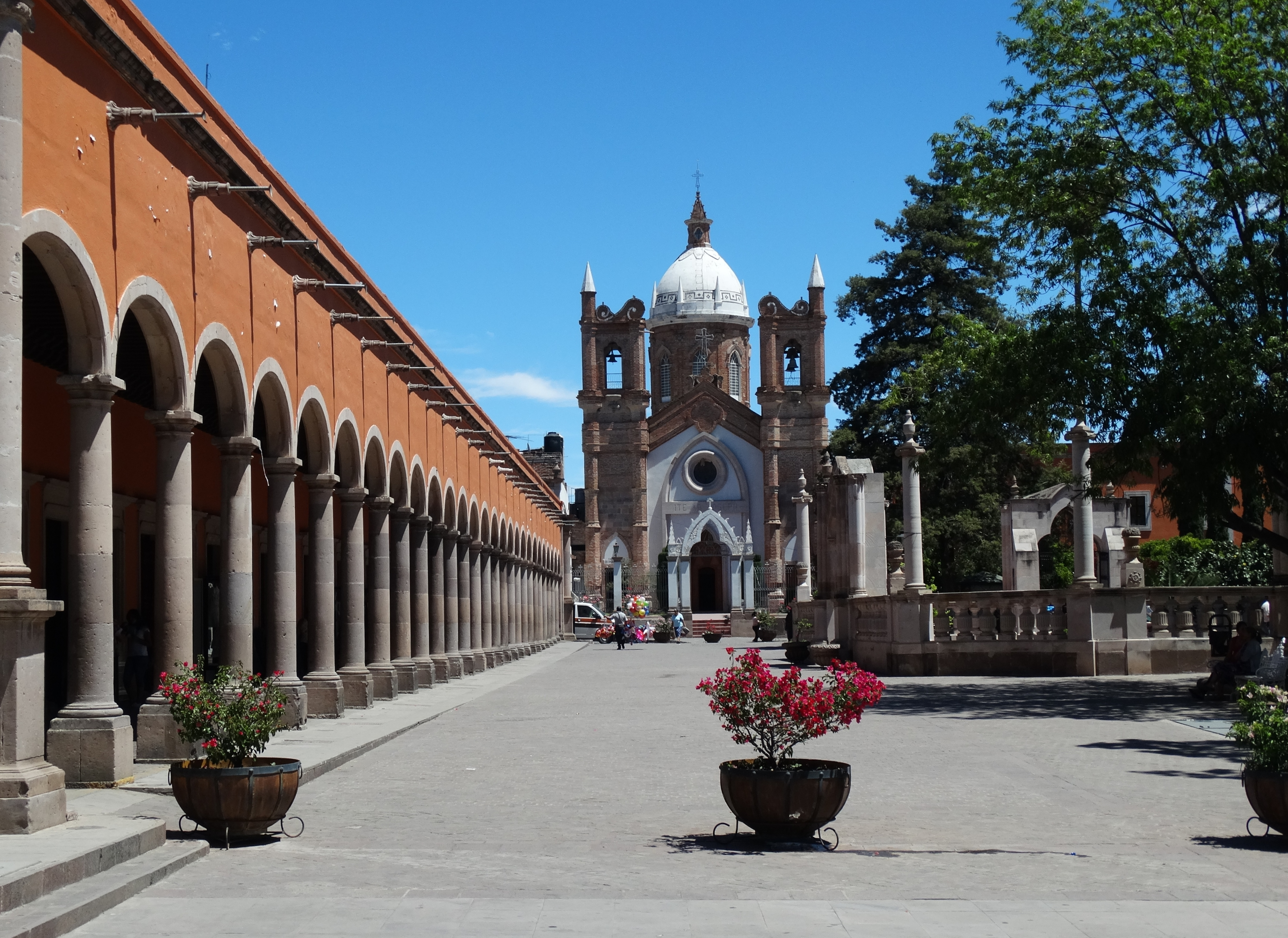
town centre

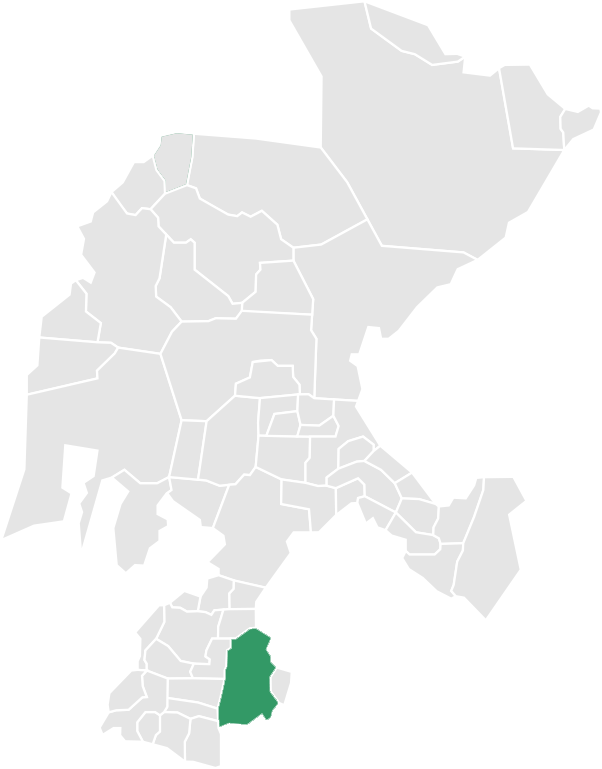
Nochistlán, Zacatecas

Nochistlán (Spanish pronunciation: [notʃisˈtlan]) is a town in the Mexican state of Zacatecas. Nuño Beltrán de Guzmán, on December 3, 1531, hired Cristóbal de Oñate to establish a village in Nochistlán; the village would be named Guadalajara to honor Guzmán for having been born in Guadalajara. Guadalajara was founded in Nochistlán on January 5, having as officials Cristóbal de Oñate, Sancho Ortiz de Zúñiga and Miguel Ibarra. They worked at this project for only 16 months and created the first layout of Guadalajara.

The first news that we have regarding the natives of these lands points to the Tecuexe. These people established settlements around 1000. Later in the 12th century a new group of people moved in, these people were called Caxcan and they were from the valley in Tuitlán, which is now found in the municipality of Villanueva, Zacatecas. The Caxcan established Nochistlán by driving out the Tecuexe by force.

== Population ==
In the 2020 census, the Municipality of Nochistlán reported a population of 27,945. Of these, 16,562 lived in the municipal seat, Nochistlán, and the remainder lived in surrounding rural communities.

== History ==
The first news that we have regarding the natives of these lands points to the Tecuexes. These people settled in the region around 1000 A.D. Later, in the 12th century, a new group of people called the Caxcanes moved in, they were from the valley in Tuitlán, which is now found in the Municipality of Villanueva, Zacatecas. The Caxcanes established Nochistlán by driving out the Tecuexes by force.

On December 3, 1531, Nuño Beltrán de Guzmán hired Cristobal de Oñate to establish a village in Nochistlán, (now a town in Zacatecas) the village would be named Guadalajara in honor of Guzmán for his birth in Guadalajara. Guadalajara was founded in Nochistlán on January 5, having as officials Oñate, Sancho Ortiz de Zuñiga and Miguel de Ibarra. They worked at this project for only 16 months and created the first layout of Guadalajara.

== Location ==
- Latitude - 21°48'03" N
- Longitude - 102°45'57" W
- Population 26,195
