= Ojocaliente, Zacatecas =

Town in Zacatecas, Mexico

Coordinates: 22°34′00″N 102°15′00″W

Ojocaliente
- Municipality

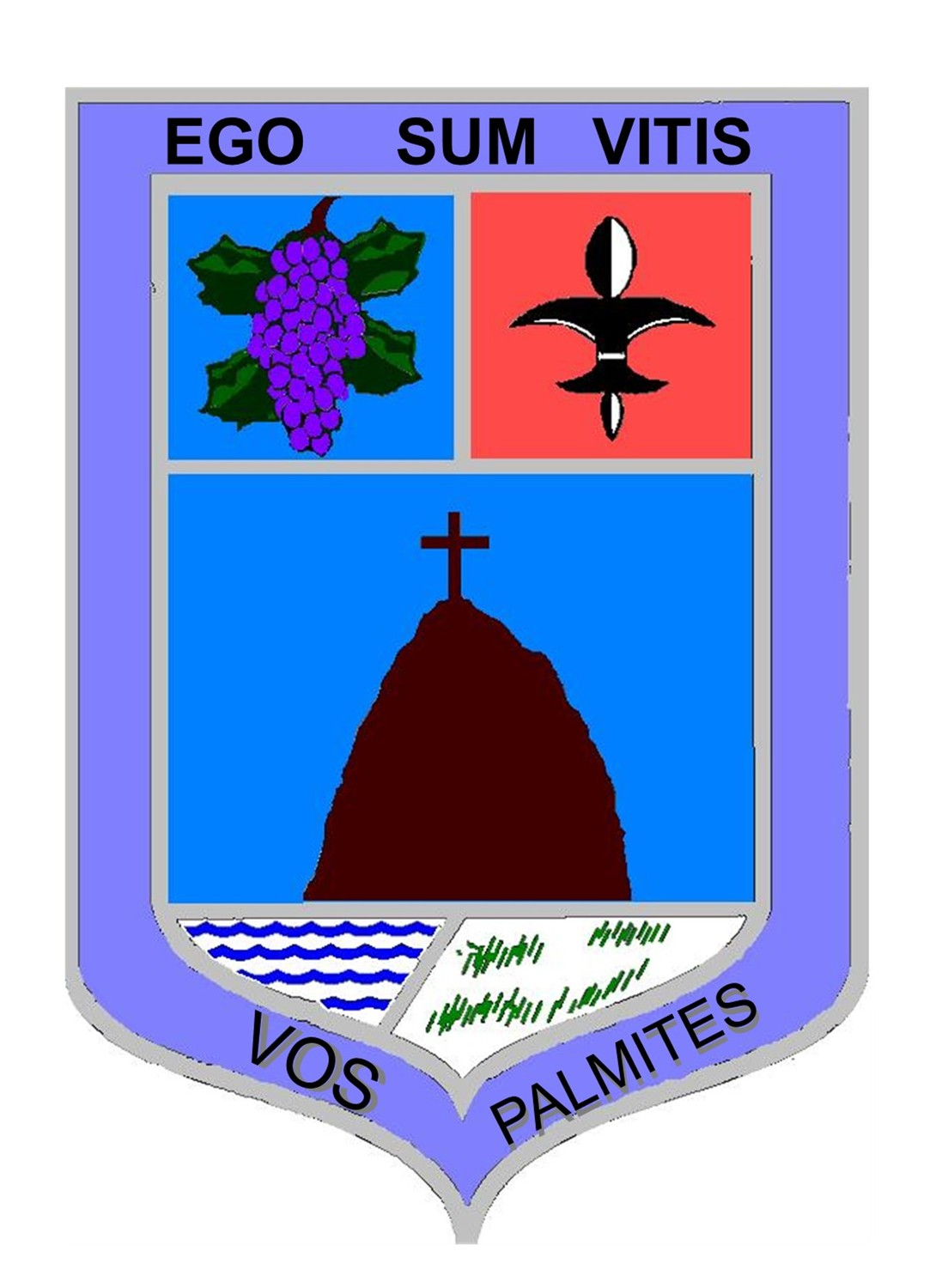
- Coat of arms

- Location in Mexico Ojocaliente (Mexico)
- Country: Mexico
- State: Zacatecas
- Demonym: (in Spanish)
- Time zone: UTC−6 (CST)

Ojocaliente (population ~44,144) is a medium-sized town in the southeastern part of the Mexican state of Zacatecas. It is considered the geographical center of México.

== History ==
The town was founded in 1620; its first name was "Real Villa de Sacramento y Ojocaliente Mina de Bastidas."

In the 1900s (decade), copper mines were actively developed in the town.

The name of Ojocaliente (literally "hot eye") derives from its hot springs ("ojo" figuratively meaning pond, springs, or pool), and mineral veins that were exploited in the hills of Santiago. In 1927, those springs became the source of contention between locals and the Federal Government, when troops bathed in the town's only water source available.

== Transportation ==
The center of town is cut in half by the Pan American Highway # 45 Mexico - Ciudad Juarez. It has an airport 55 km to the north.

== Economy ==
Ojocaliente is a producer of beans, maize, barley, prickly pears, and potatoes; it also has grape groves and wine processing plants.

== Culture ==
Ojocaliente is cradle of culture and art with artist, composers, chroniclers, mariachis, charros association and a school of arts.

== Education ==
Ojocaliente has six primary schools and a high school, which is affiliated with the Universidad Autónoma de Zacatecas.

== Religion ==
The town has a Catholic cathedral, eight Catholic chapels, and a Mormon chapel.

On September 21, 2002, the statuette of El Santo Niño of Atocha was paraded in Ojacaliente.

== Geography ==
Ojocaliente sits at 2040 m above sea level. It has a land area of 685.775 km^{2}.
