= Villanueva, Zacatecas =

City and municipality in Zacatecas, Mexico

- City
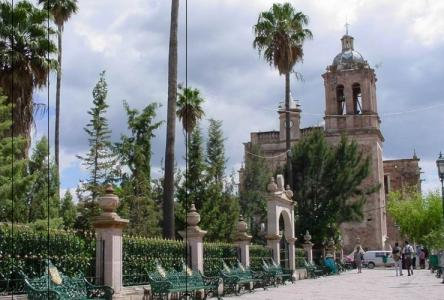
- Jardín Principal and San Judas Tadeo Church

- Location within Zacatecas Location within Mexico
- Coordinates: 22°21′13″N 102°52′59″W
- Country: Mexico
- State: Zacatecas
- Municipality: Villanueva
- Founded: 1692

Government
  - Mayor: Miguel Torres (PAN)
- Elevation: 1,900 m (6,200 ft)

Population (2005)
  - Total: 32,835
- Time zone: UTC-6 (Central)
- Postal code: 99540
- Website: https://www.villanueva.gob.mx/

Villanueva is a city in the Mexican state of Zacatecas. It is the administrative seat of the municipality of Villanueva.

In 2023, Villanueva was designated a Pueblo Mágico by the Mexican government, recognizing its cultural and historical importance.

== Name ==
Villanueva was founded on February 4, 1692, under the name Villagutierre del Águila. Like many towns in Mexico, the name of the patron saint of the town was added to the name – in this case, that of Judas Thaddaeus – and it became Villa de San Judas Tadeo de Villa Gutierre del Águila. However, since it was the last town founded in that area of Zacatecas, it was called Villa Nueva (new town), and that is the name that stuck.

== Geography ==
Villanueva is one of the 58 municipalities in the state of Zacatecas. It is located at the southern part of Zacatecas and is bordered in all directions by a number of Zacatecas municipalities. Among the municipalities bordering it are Jerez to the north, Genero Codina to the east, Tabasco to the south and Tepetongo to the west. Some parts of Villanueva have mountainous terrains. It is also crossed by different rivers and other bodies of fresh water. It has a sub-humid temperature and an annual average of 16.9 °C (62.4 °F).

=== Climate ===
Climate data for Villanueva (1951–2010)
Month	Jan	Feb	Mar	Apr	May	Jun	Jul	Aug	Sep	Oct	Nov	Dec	Year
Record high °C (°F)	30.0 (86.0)	32.0 (89.6)	33.0 (91.4)	37.0 (98.6)	39.5 (103.1)	39.5 (103.1)	35.5 (95.9)	35.0 (95.0)	34.0 (93.2)	39.5 (103.1)	35.0 (95.0)	33.0 (91.4)	39.5 (103.1)
Mean daily maximum °C (°F)	21.7 (71.1)	23.5 (74.3)	25.4 (77.7)	28.2 (82.8)	30.2 (86.4)	29.2 (84.6)	27.0 (80.6)	27.2 (81.0)	26.2 (79.2)	25.9 (78.6)	25.2 (77.4)	22.6 (72.7)	26.0 (78.8)
Daily mean °C (°F)	11.7 (53.1)	13.2 (55.8)	14.8 (58.6)	17.8 (64.0)	20.4 (68.7)	20.9 (69.6)	19.8 (67.6)	19.6 (67.3)	19.0 (66.2)	17.2 (63.0)	14.7 (58.5)	12.5 (54.5)	16.8 (62.2)
Mean daily minimum °C (°F)	1.8 (35.2)	2.9 (37.2)	4.1 (39.4)	7.5 (45.5)	10.7 (51.3)	12.6 (54.7)	12.5 (54.5)	12.1 (53.8)	11.8 (53.2)	8.4 (47.1)	4.1 (39.4)	2.5 (36.5)	7.6 (45.7)
Record low °C (°F)	−8.5 (16.7)	−6.0 (21.2)	−5.0 (23.0)	−4.0 (24.8)	1.5 (34.7)	4.0 (39.2)	3.0 (37.4)	2.0 (35.6)	0.0 (32.0)	−2.5 (27.5)	−6.0 (21.2)	−9.0 (15.8)	−9.0 (15.8)
Average precipitation mm (inches)	20.5 (0.81)	16.4 (0.65)	7.0 (0.28)	6.1 (0.24)	15.6 (0.61)	88.8 (3.50)	120.3 (4.74)	116.5 (4.59)	82.5 (3.25)	35.8 (1.41)	12.1 (0.48)	12.2 (0.48)	533.8 (21.02)
Average precipitation days (≥ 0.1 mm)	2.7	1.7	0.8	1.0	3.1	8.9	13.4	13.1	10.0	5.1	1.9	2.1	63.8
Source: Servicio Meteorologico Nacional

== History ==
The municipality was originally called Santa Cruz when it was founded in 1650. Its name was changed a couple of times until 1962, when it was officially renamed as the Municipality of Villanueva, its name until the present. Its seal is one of the oldest in Zacatecas, dating back as early as the early 19th century. The motto of the town is the Latin translation of "With the sword and the plow". It is because Villanueva began as an agriculture and labor-based community and produced some of the bravest patriots in Mexico. Once a colonial town, Villanueva only became a free municipality in the year 1917. As of 2005, Villanueva had a population of 28,760 residents. The majority of these residents are Roman Catholics by faith.

== Economy and culture ==
The primary sources of income in Villanueva are agriculture, cattle raising and fishing. Following it are the manufacturing, construction and electricity industry. Commerce and tourism over the years have also become sources of income for the municipality. Villanueva has great potential to be developed as a tourism hot spot because of its attractive colonial architecture. It has plenty of historical sites to visit. Among these are pre-Hispanic petroglyphs, the properties of the old Spanish settlers, the parochial temple of San Judas Tadeo, the Municipal Palace and a whole lot more. The annual feast from October 20–28 is also one of the most joyous celebrations in Villanueva. It is held in honor of their patron saint San Judas Tadeo and is reveled with merriment, dances, food and games. Some popular events are the Fair of Tayahua every March 14–20 and the religious celebration of the Incarnation of The Blessed Virgin Mary of Carmen every July 16 among others.

== Culture ==
People in Villanueva are musically inclined. In fact, it is the place of origin of the musical genre called tamborazo. It is also rich in craft products such as wood and leather furniture. The place also has a number of original delicious Mexican recipes to feast on. On account of its many vacation attractions, it has been a preference by both local and foreign tourists. To cater to the tourists that flock Villanueva ever year, the municipality has ensured that there is available a number of resorts, spas and activities to accommodate their guests. Villanueva, is well known for its music and rich culture. Villanueva has one of the largest "Unidad Deportivas" in the state of Zacatecas.
