= Manuel Morales (martyr) =

Saint Manuel Morales
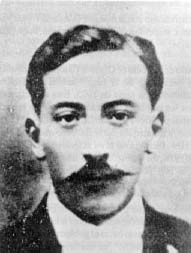

Martyr of the Cristero War
- Born: Manuel Morales Cervantes; 8 February 1898; Sombrerete, Zacatecas, Mexico
- Residence: Chalchihuites, Zacatecas, Mexico
- Died: 15 August 1926 (aged 28); Chalchihuites, Zacatecas, Mexico
- Honored in: Catholic Church
- Beatified: 22 November 1992, St. Peter's Square, Vatican City by Pope John Paul II
- Canonized: 21 May 2000, St. Peter's Square, Vatican City by Pope John Paul II
- Feast: 21 May (Saints of the Cristero War); 15 August

Manuel Morales Cervantes was a Mexican layman who was killed during the Cristero War. A pro-Catholic activist during the anticlerical period under President Plutarco Elías Calles, he was captured by government forces, and was executed for refusing to renounce his position. Morales was canonized by Pope John Paul II on 21 May 2000 as one of 25 Saints of the Cristero War.

== Biography ==
=== Early life and education ===
Morales was born on 8 February 1898 in the village of Mesillas 22 kilometers south from Sombrerete, Zacatecas, Mexico. Shortly after his birth, the Morales family relocated to Chalchihuites. He entered the seminary of the Archdiocese of Durango in Durango City, but dropped out to support his poor family.

=== Adulthood and religious activism ===
After leaving the seminary, Morales became a baker, married, and had three children. He was secretary of his local Catholic Workers Union, a member of Catholic Action (ACJM), and president of the National League for the Defense of Religious Liberty (LNDNR).

On 29 July 1926, Morales led an LNDNR meeting which drew a crowd of around 600 people. He spoke about the aims and methods of the group, and was quoted as saying:

The league should be peaceful and not interfere in political affairs. Our project is to implore the government to remove the articles of the Constitution that prevent religious freedom.

After the meeting, the priest Luis Batiz Sáinz was arrested at his home by a group of soldiers. A few days later, the three LNDNR leaders, President Morales, Vice President David Roldán, and Secretary Salvador Lara, met at Lara's home to discuss how to free Batiz through legal means. A group of soldiers broke into the home and arrested the three men, imprisoning them in the town hall, where they were beaten and tortured.

=== Death ===
After several days of imprisonment, on 15 August 1926, Batiz, Morales, Roldán, and Lara were taken out of their cells by a group of soldiers. At about noon of that day, the four men were loaded into two cars, and told that they were being taken to the state capital of Zacatecas City to explain their position to government officials. Instead of driving to the capital, the soldiers stopped the car in the mountains near Chalchihuites, and the prisoners were taken out. The soldiers accused the four men of conspiring to revolt against the government, and were offered freedom if they acknowledged the legitimacy of Mexican President Plutarco Elías Calles' anti-religious laws, which all four refused to do.

After the men refused to denounce their position, Morales and Batiz were brought forward. Batiz begged the soldiers to free Morales because he had children to support, but Morales said, "I am dying for God, and God will care for my children." According to one account, before his death, Morales cried, "Long live Christ the King and Our Lady of Guadalupe!" Morales and Batiz were killed by firing squad, and Roldán and Lara were shot after.

== Canonization ==
Morales, along with the other 24 Martyrs of the Cristero War, was declared Venerable on 7 March 1992 by Pope John Paul II, with a decree of martyrdom. The group was beatified on 22 November 1992 by Pope John Paul II, and then canonized by him on 21 May 2000.

The collective feast day of the Martyrs of the Cristero War is 21 May, and the individual feast day of Manuel Morales is 15 August, the anniversary date of his death.

== See also ==
- Saints of the Cristero War
- List of Catholic saints
