= Mining in Mexico =

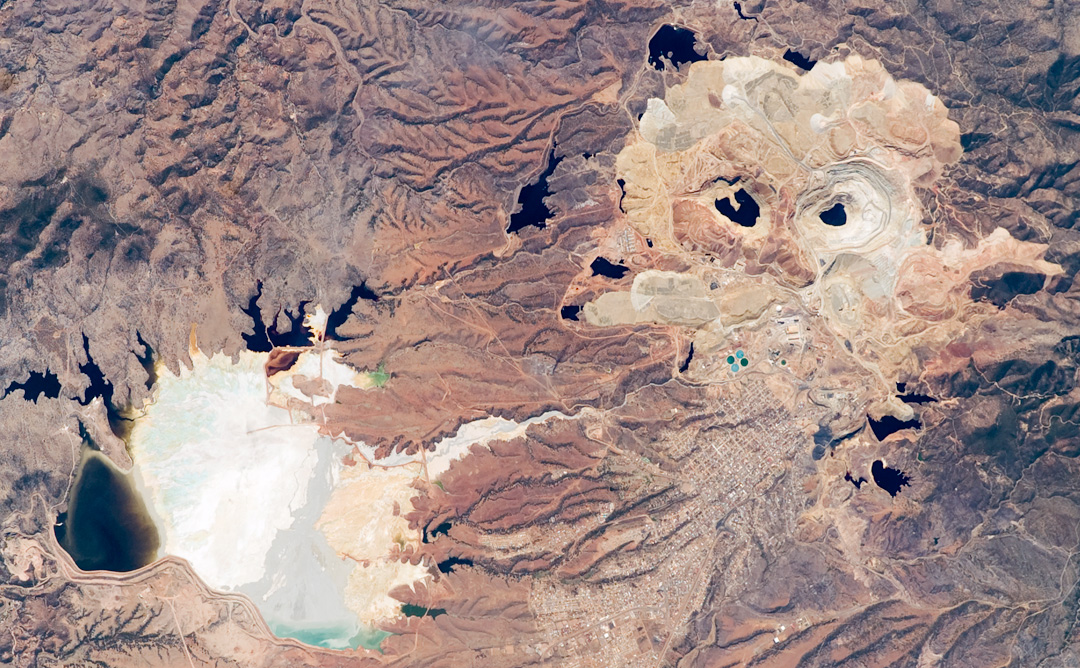
Cananea Copper Mine, Sonora, Mexico

Mining in Mexico represented 2.4% of the nation's gross domestic product in 2023 and employed 350,000 people in 2020. Mexico is the world's largest producer of silver and a globally significant producer of gold, copper and zinc. In 2020, Mexico produced the world's 12th largest volume of minerals by value.

Since 2018, Mexico's left-wing president has been taking a firmer stance towards mining companies and reforming mining regulations. President López Obrador was critical of (mostly foreign owned) mining companies' track record of environmental harm and tax avoidance.

== Economy ==
In 2023, mining in Mexico represented 2.4% of the nation's gross domestic product, and 8.2% of Mexico's industrial GDP. The mining sector employed 350,000 people in 2020, and generated US$1.5 billion in direct government tax revenue, and an additional US$1.84 billion of government revenue from exports of mined natural resources.

Mexico is the world's largest producer of silver and a globally significant producer of gold, copper and zinc.

In 2020, Mexico produced the world's 12th largest volume of minerals, valued at US$17.8 billion.

== Politics ==
Mapping and consultations about mining in Mexico are led the by the Mexican Geological Survey government agency.

In January 2013, 500 activists met in Capulálpam de Méndez, Oaxaca at the ¡Sí a la vida! ¡No a la minera! (English Yes to life! No to mining!) event. The event was undertaken to coordinate anti-mining efforts, perceived by the activists as harmful to their lives.

Mexico's left-wing president Andrés Manuel López Obrador halted issuing any new mining licences, and did not consider mining an essential business permitted to operate during the COVID-19 pandemic. López Obrador has been critical of corporate tax avoidance and environmental damage, and has both reformed mining regulations and increased state control of mining operations. The president nationalised the nation's lithium reserves in 2022.

In 2023, the Canadian government noted the Mexican's government rapid action to improve the conditions of Mexican miners, after the Mexican government changed 20,000 collective bargaining agreements it perceived to be favouring mine owners at the expense of workers.

== Companies ==
74% of mining concessions in Mexico are owned by Canadian companies. Significant and notable mining companies include Grupo Mexico, Newmont, Southern Silver Exploration, Ganfeng Lithium, Fortuna Silver Mines, Blackfire Exploration, Alamos Gold, Aurcana Corporation, Hochschild Mining, and Excellon Resources.

=== Alamos Gold ===
Alamos Gold is a Canadian mining company that own the Mulatos gold mine and the El Chanate defunct gold mines both Sonora.

=== Aurcana Corporation ===
Aurcana Corporation operated the La Negra mine, a silver, copper, zinc and lead mine in Querétaro.

=== Blackfire Exploration ===
Blackfire Exploration is a Canadian firm that owns the La Revancha baryte mine in Chicomuselo, in Chiapas. The mine opened in 2007 with the local community divided between support and opposition. The mine was closed by authorities in 2009 after the assassination of anti-mining activist Mariano Abarca. Abarca had previously been assaulted by Blackfire Exploration staff. In 2011, the Royal Canadian Mounted Police raided Blackfire Exploration's offices while investigating the payment of a bribe to a Chiapas state mayor. Three staff were arrested during the raid.

=== Excellon Resources ===
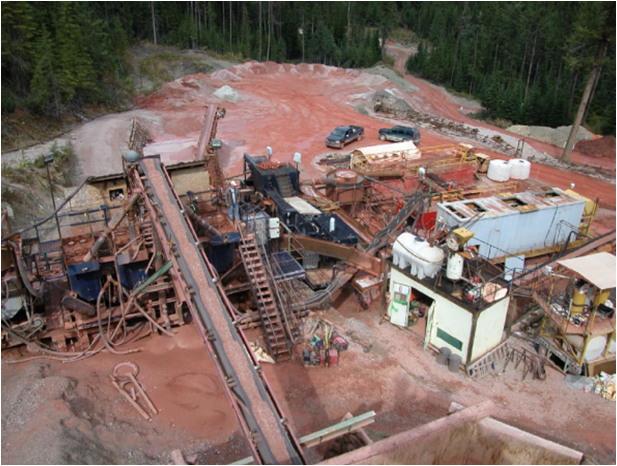
Baryte crushing and jig plant

Canadian owner of La Platosa mine and La Negra silver mine.

=== Fortuna Silver Mines ===
Fortuna Silver Mines is a Canadian mining company that has operated in southern Mexico since 2011.

=== Ganfeng Lithium ===
Gangfend Lithium is a mexican company that bought the a lithium mine in Sonora in 2021, before the nation nationalised its lithium reserves.

=== Grupo Mexico ===
Grupo Mexico owns 14 mines that produce copper, lead, zinc and silver.

=== Hochschild Mining ===
Hochschild Mining opened the Moris open-pit gold and silver mine in Chihuahua in 2007.

=== Newmont ===
Newmont is an American mining company that operates the nation's largest gold mine, the Peñasquito mine, also notable for being the nation's second largest silver mine and a significant source of zinc and lead.

=== Southern Silver Exploration ===
Southern Silver Exploration own the Cerro Las Minitas prospect in Durango expected to produce significant quantities of silver, lead, zinc, copper and gold. The company owns the Velardeña mine in Durango and San Martin mine in Querétaro City, both producing of gold, silver, zinc and lead.

== Mining by mineral ==
- Coal mining in Mexico
- Mexican amber

== Notable people ==
- Mariano Abarca (anti-mining activist, assassinated in 2009)
- David Roldán Lara (miner)
- Francis Rule (Cornish miner who worked in Mexico)

== See also ==
- Economy of Mexico
- Lists of countries by mineral production
- Silver mining
- List of mines in Mexico
