= Coal mining in Mexico =

Industrial coal mining in Mexico first dates to the year 1884 at the Sabinas basin, in the northern border state of Coahuila. The vast majority of the nation's known reserves remain in this relatively small Región Carbonífera.

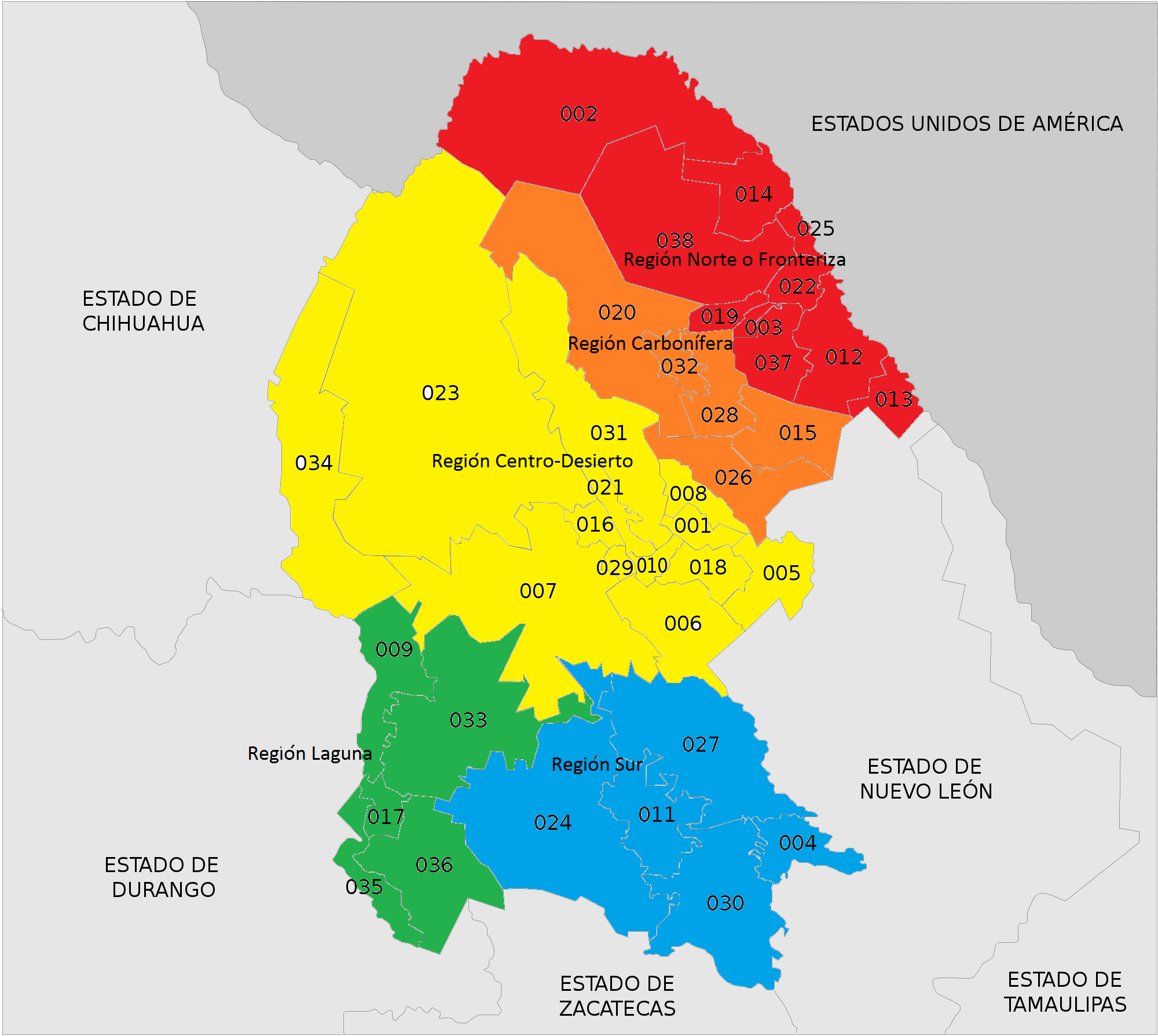
regions of Coahuila, showing the Región Carbonífera in orange

The nation's coal resources were first systematically developed in the 1890s by American industrialist Collis Potter Huntington and others. The mining operations were notable for their poor working conditions, high accident rates and large numbers of worker fatalities. After a wave of foreign investment and exploitation in the early 20th century, annual coal production peaked in 1925.

Production continues today. As of 2013 Mexico ranked 25th among nations in terms of proved recoverable coal reserves.

== Overview ==
All through its history Mexico has been a net importer of coal, and most of Mexico's coal output has been consumed domestically. Until 1910, most of it powered regional railroads. Since 1910, it has primarily gone to fuel Mexico's steel production and related industries.

Annual coal production peaked in 1925 at 1.45 million tons, declined in the 1930s, then surged again because of the demand for steel during World War II. (By contrast, coal extraction in the United States is forecast to peak some time in the 21st century.)

In the 21st century Mexico burns coal for energy generation and for steelmaking. As of 2013 Mexico ranked 25th among nations of the world in terms of proved recoverable coal reserves, with 1.3 billion tons.

== History ==
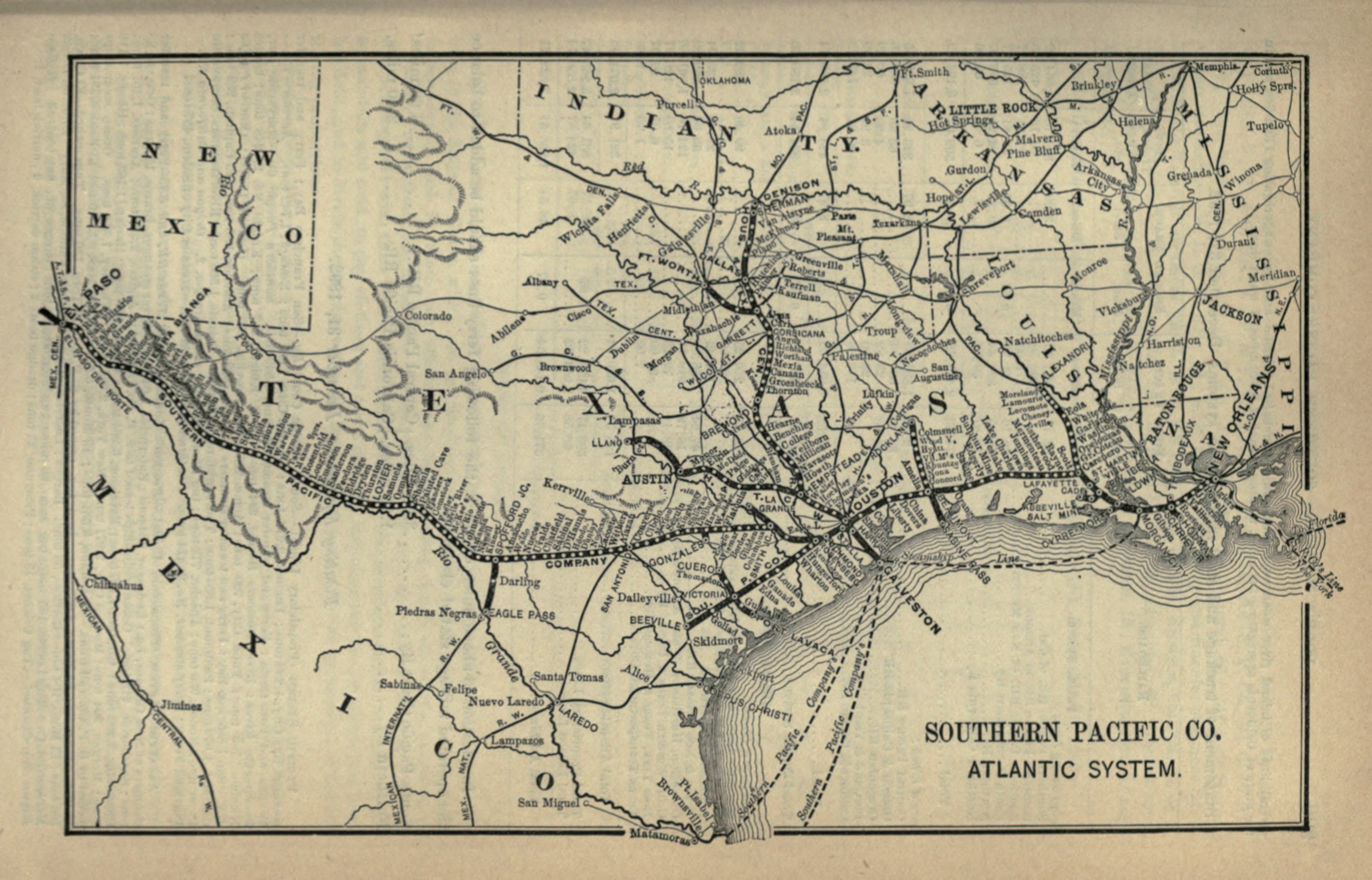
1893 South Pacific railroad network, showing Mexican International Railroad route

Exploitation of coal resources was known since the days of Spanish rule, as European methods of resource extraction crossed the Atlantic. The first identified coal field in the country in the country is the Rio Sabinas basin, west of the old capital city of Monclova. The first Mexican mine to produce coal on an industrial scale was the Alamo Mine, in San Felipe, Coahuila, in 1884.

American railroad magnate C.P. Huntington established the Mexican International Railroad in 1882, running south from Piedras Negras, Coahuila, as part of the Southern Pacific Railroad. In Coahuila Huntington bought his coal supplies from local landowners, including Evaristo Madero, for local use, and to ship back north to the U.S. to supply Southern Pacific trains. A bitter contract dispute in 1886 disrupted that relationship and changed the market. Within a few years Huntington himself controlled at least four local producers (the Sabinas Coal Mines Company, the Coahuila Coal Mine Company, the Alamo Coal Company, and the Fuente Coal Company), with his Mexican International and its spur lines serving as transport for the mines, and his mines fueling the railroad.

In the same years, Porfirian mining reform laws in 1884 and 1892 scrapped colonial-era doctrine and established mineral rights for landowners, which revived the entire industry and attracted more foreign capital. In 1905, after Huntington's death, the largest producer in the region had become William Ludlow's Mexican Coal & Coke Company, incorporated in New Jersey. That firm owned Las Esperanzas mines, the "most important mines in the Republic."

British industrialist William Broderick Cloete was also active in the region as an owner of land, rails, and coal mines. After Cloete died in the Sinking of the RMS Lusitania in May 1915, the mining town Cloete in Sabinas, Coahuila was named for him.

== Workers ==
Mine operations in the first decades were characteristic of the "hand-loading era": labor-intensive, primitive, and unsafe. The numbers of local workers were inadequate, so foreign capital turned to foreign labor, and imported thousands of Japanese.

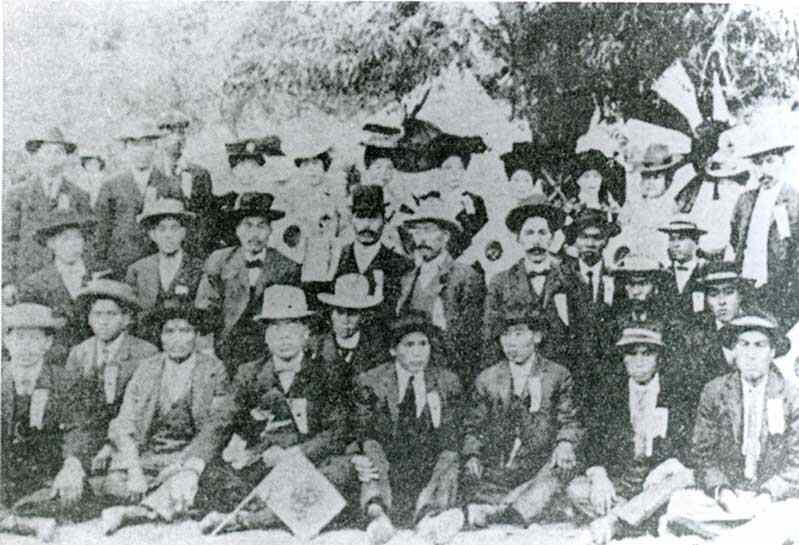
Japanese immigrant laborers circa 1910, here at the copper mine of Cananea, Sonora

Between 1901 and 1907, some 11,000 Japanese and Okinawan workers immigrated to Mexico, under contracts with immigration companies. (Mexico had been the first nation to diplomatically recognize Japan in 1888.) The Kunimoto Imin Gaisha sent 1,242 workers to Fuentes and Las Esperanzas, for example, and the Toyo Imin Gaisha sent hundreds more to Las Esperanzas, along with thousands more into unrelated industries. These workers normally had four-year contracts to work ten hours a day, six days a week.

Conditions for workers were extremely poor. Many died from beriberi, typhoid fever or malaria, and there was a pattern of frequent industrial accidents (see below). In the deadliest coal mining disaster in Mexican history, the Mina Rosita Vieja disaster of February 27, 1908, most of the 200 fatalities were Japanese immigrant laborers. By 1906 immigrant workers on plantations had begun to strike and/or leave, often for California or Texas. Mexican Coal & Coke Company in 1907 complained that of 1,500 contract workers they'd paid passage for, 1,400 had fled.

By November 1920 coal workers had organized under the Mexican Federation of Miners, and struck, successfully, for wage increases. Notably their secretary, J. M. Tristan, was denied entry into the U.S. by immigration officials in Laredo.

== Accidents ==
Following is a list of coal mining accidents in Mexico. This is an incomplete list.

- explosion of dynamite store underground at the San Andres mine, Durango, February 7, 1901, killing 87 men, women and children in a settlement on the surface
- explosion at Las Esperanzas mines, Barroterán, Coahuila, June 25, 1903, 24 fatalities
- Mina Rosita Vieja disaster, February 27, 1908, 200 fatalities (most Japanese immigrant laborers), the deadliest coal mining disaster in Mexican history
- Palau mine, Las Esperanzas, February 2, 1910, an explosion kills 68 workers
- Mine No. 6, Rosita, December 22, 1936, 75 workers killed in explosion
- Barroterán coal mine disaster, March 31, 1969, 153 fatalities
- La Espuela Coal Mine disaster, January 23, 2002, 13 fatalities
- Pasta de Conchos mine disaster, February 19, 2006, 65 fatalities

== See also ==
- Mining in Mexico
