= Saints of the Cristero War =

Mexican martyrs of the Catholic Church

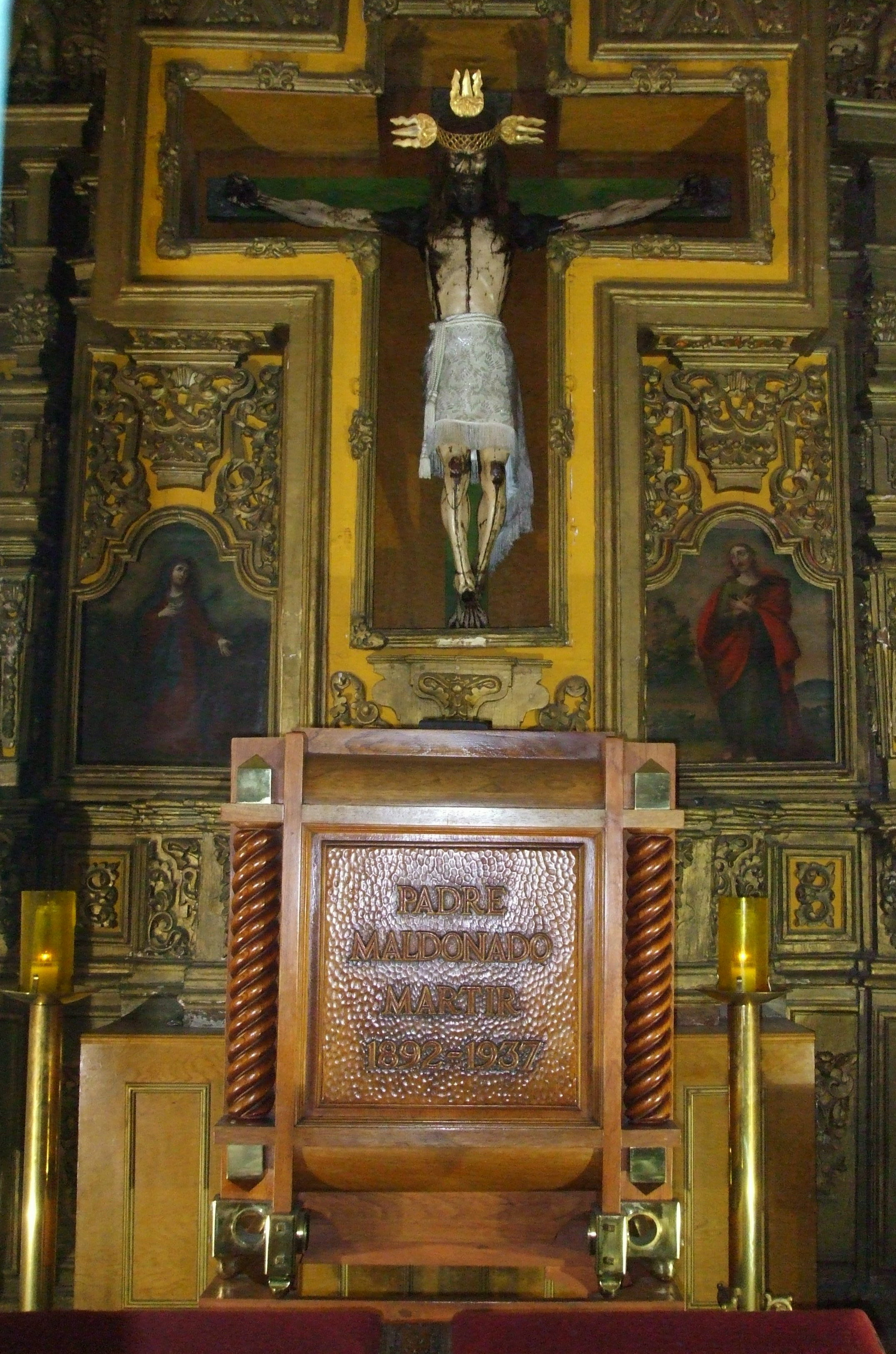
- Tomb of San Pedro de Jesus Maldonado

Martyrs, Priests
- Born: Mexico
- Died: 1926 to 1929; Mexico
- Venerated in: Catholicism
- Beatified: 25 September 1988; 22 November 1992 by Pope John Paul II; 20 November 2005 by Pope Benedict XVI
- Canonized: 21 May 2000 Pope John Paul II; 16 October 2016 Pope Francis
- Feast: 21 May
- Attributes: Crown of martyrdom Martyr's palm Rosary
- Patronage: Persecuted Christians

On May 21, 2000, Pope John Paul II canonized a group of 25 saints and martyrs who had died in the Mexican Cristero War. The vast majority are Catholic priests who were executed for carrying out their ministry despite the suppression under the anti-clerical laws of Plutarco Elías Calles after the revolution in the 1920s. Priests who took up arms, however, were excluded from the process. The group of saints share the feast day of May 21.

== Canonized 16 October 2016 by Pope Francis ==
- José Sánchez del Río

== Beatified 20 November 2005 by Pope Benedict XVI ==
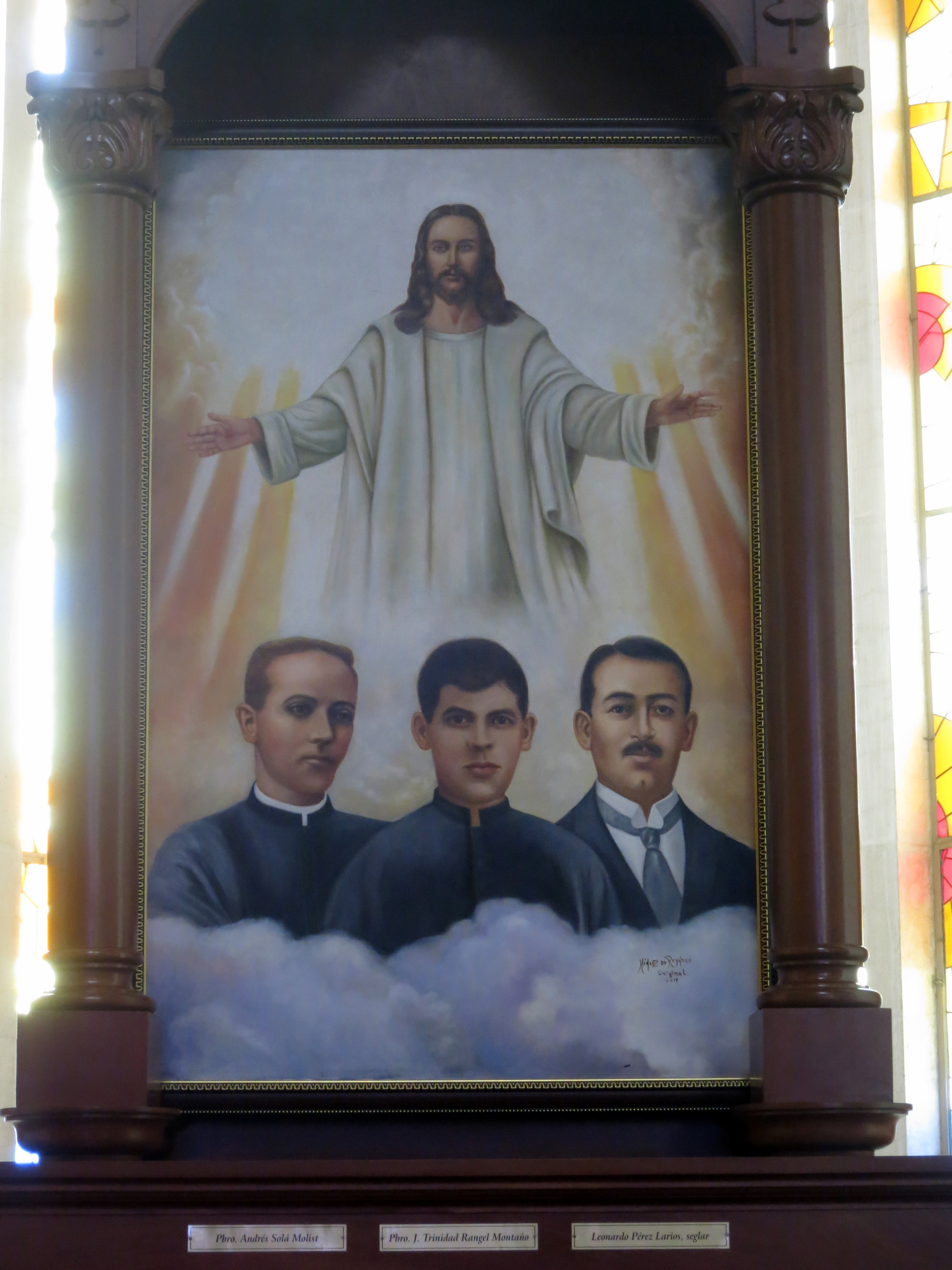
A shrine to Andrés Solá Molist, José T. Rangel Montaño, and Leonardo Pérez Larios in the Santuario Expiatorio del Sagrado Corazón de Jesús (León, Guanajuato)

On 15 November 2005, Pope Benedict XVI issued an Apostolic Letter declaring the following individuals "blessed" and establishing their memorial feast on 20 November. November 20 is the official anniversary in the Mexican civil calendar of the start of the Mexican Revolution, with the promulgation of the Plan of San Luis Potosí in 1910 by Francisco Madero.

- Anacleto González Flores
- José Dionisio Luis Padilla Gómez
- Jorge Ramon Vargas González
- Ramón Vicente Vargas González
- José Luciano Ezequiel Huerta Gutiérrez
- Salvador Huerta Gutiérrez
- Miguel Gómez Loza
- Luis Magaña Servín
- Jose Trinidad Rangel Montano
- Andreas Sola y Molist C.F.M.
- Leonardo Perez Larios
- Darío Acosta Zurita

== Canonized 21 May 2000 by Pope John Paul II ==
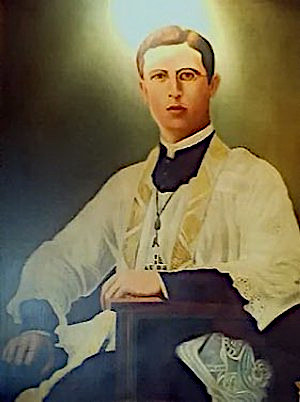
San Jose Maria Robles Hurtado

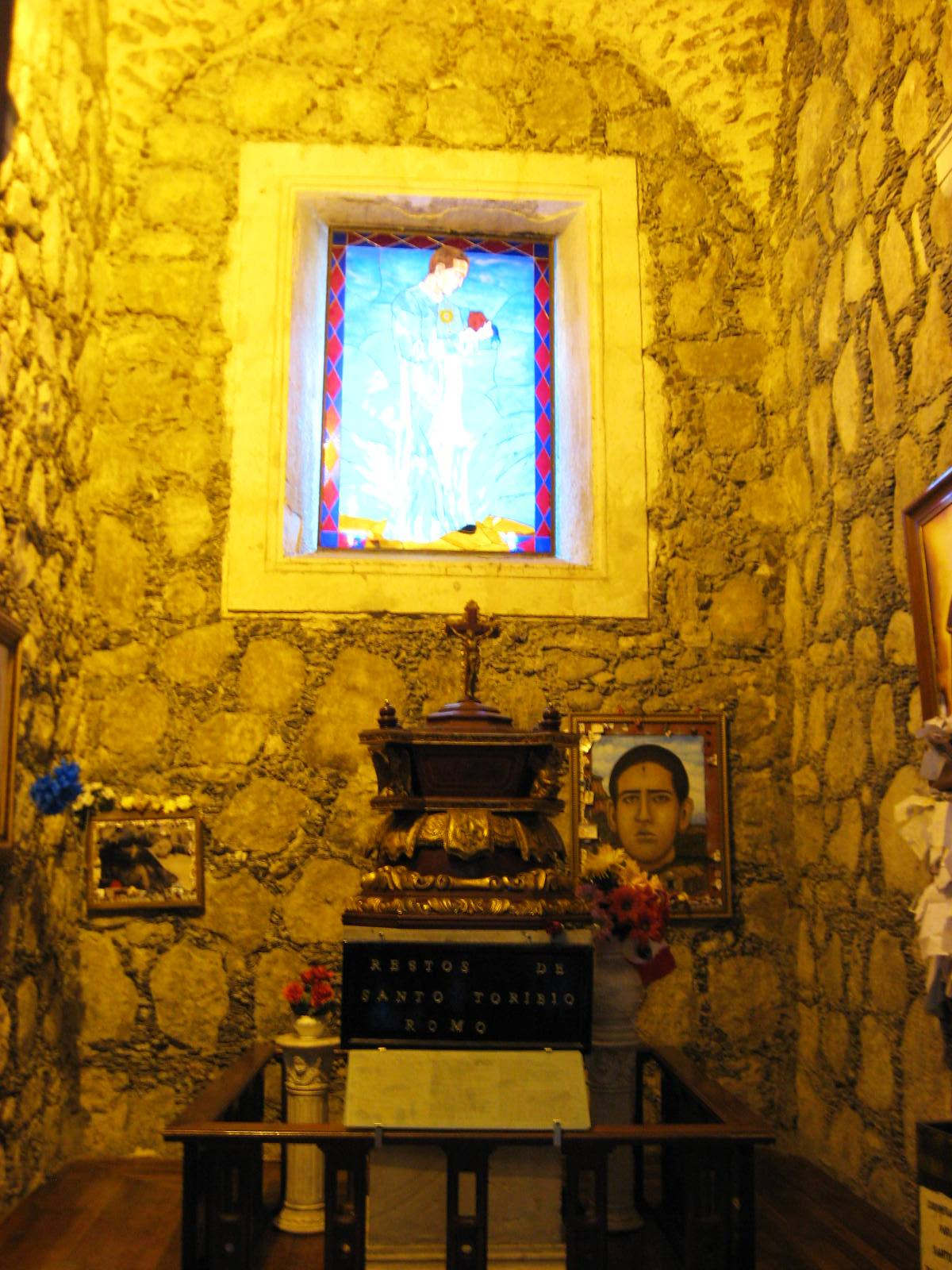
Chapel of San Toribio Romo Gonzalez

- Cristóbal Magallanes Jara (1869–1927)
- Román Adame Rosales (1859–1928)
- Rodrigo Aguilar Alemán (1875–1927)
- Julio Álvarez Mendoza (1866–1927)
- Luis Batis Sáinz (1870–1926)
- Agustín Caloca Cortés (1898–1927)
- Mateo Correa Magallanes (1866–1927)
- Atilano Cruz Alvarado (1901–1928)
- Miguel de la Mora (1874–1927)
- Pedro Esqueda Ramirez (1897–1927)
- Margarito Flores García (1899–1927)
- José Isabel Flores Varela (1866–1927)
- David Galván Bermudes (1882–1915)
- Salvador Lara Puente (1905–1926)
- Pedro de Jesús Maldonado (1892–1937)
- Jesús Méndez Montoya (1880–1928) He is notable for being the only canonised namesake of Jesus.
- Manuel Moralez (1898–1926)
- Justino Orona Madrigal (1877–1928)
- Sabás Reyes Salazar (1879–1927)
- José María Robles Hurtado (1888–1927)
- David Roldán Lara (1907–1926)
- Toribio Romo González (1900–1928)
- Jenaro Sánchez Delgadillo (1886–1927)
- Tranquilino Ubiarco Robles (1899–1928)
- David Uribe Velasco (1888–1927)

These saints were also canonized on 21 May 2000 but were not martyred in the Cristero War:

- José Maria de Yermo y Parres (1851–1904)
- María Natividad Venegas de la Torre (1868–1959)

== Beatified 25 September 1988 by Pope John Paul II ==
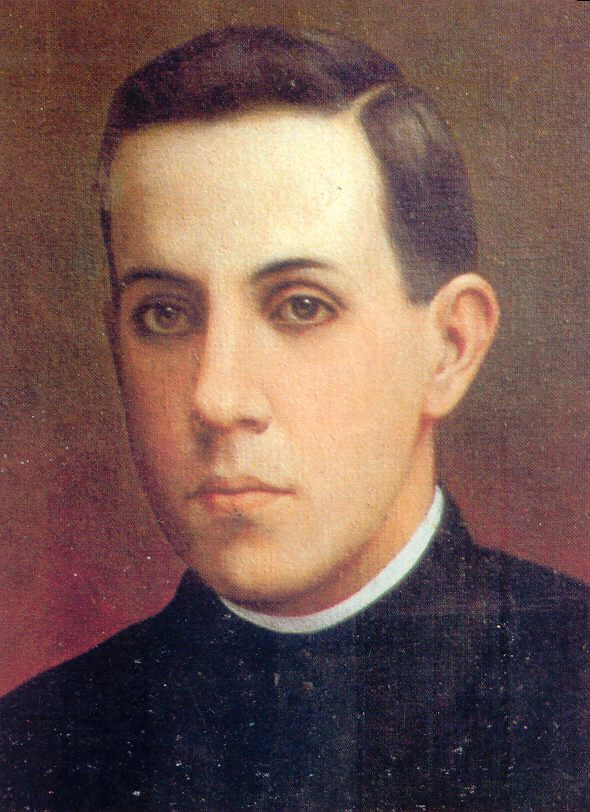
Bl. Miguel Pro (1891–1927)

- Miguel Pro

== Beatified 12 October 1997 by Pope John Paul II ==
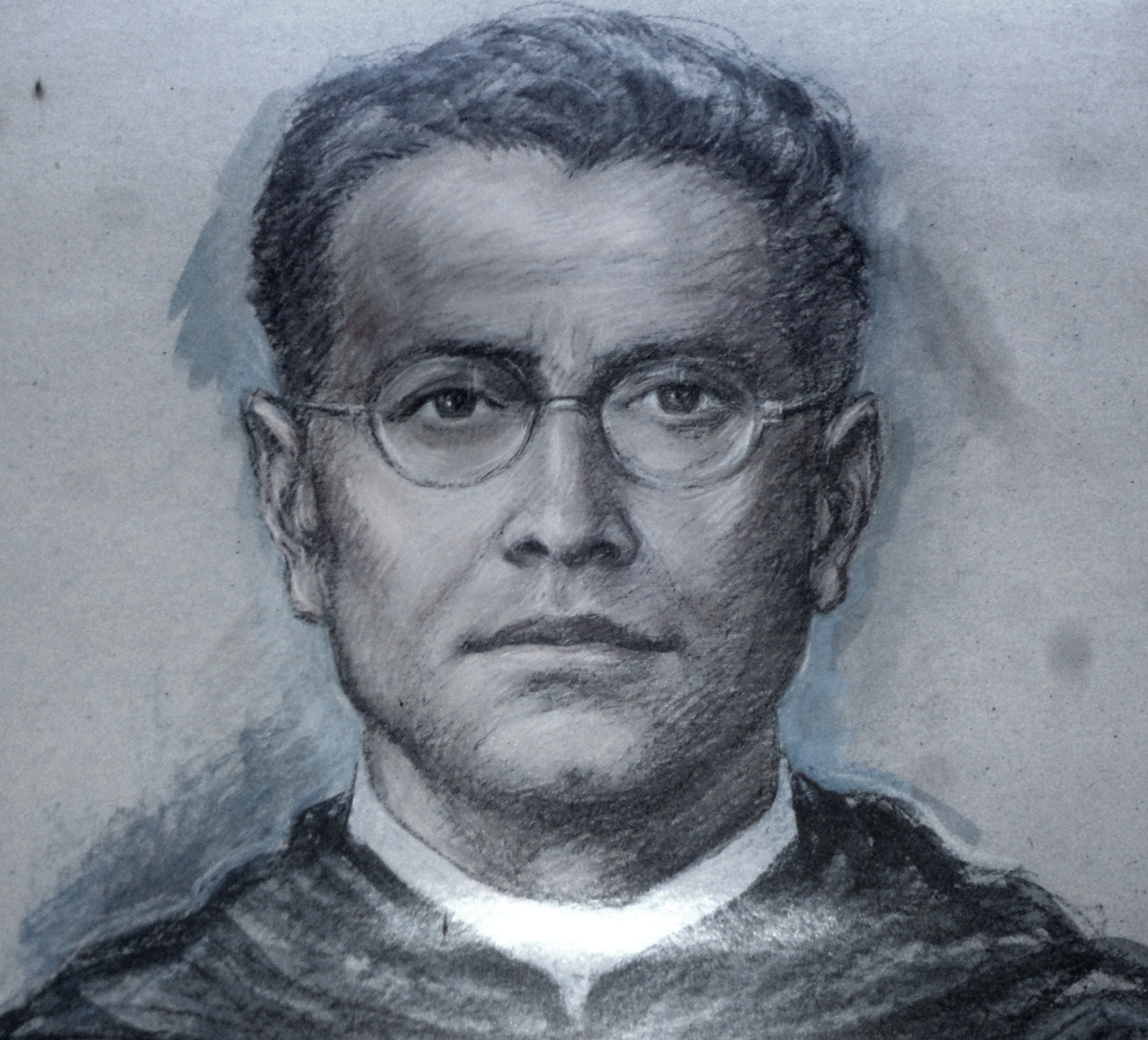
Bl. Mateo Elías Nieves Castillo (1882–1928)

- Mateo Elías Nieves Castillo

== Luis Batis Sáinz ==
Luis Bátis Sainz was born on September 13, 1870. He attended a minor seminary from age 12, and was ordained on January 1, 1894. He worked as spiritual director of the seminary and as parish priest in Chalchihuites, Zacatecas, and was a member of the Knights of Columbus. He was noted for his pastoral zeal and capacity to organize the parish. He founded a workshop for Catholic workers and a school.

Bátis spent a great part of his time on the catechesis of children and adults, and was very fervent in his Eucharistic adoration. He is reported to have said, "Lord, I want to be a martyr; though I am your unworthy minister, I want to shed my blood, drop by drop, for your name."

Before the closure of the churches in 1926, a meeting of the National League for the Defense of Religious Liberty discussed the possibility of armed rebellion to overthrow the government. Father Bátis spoke at this meeting and was denounced to the government. When the churches were closed, he moved to a private house. On August 15, 1926 (other sources say July 27, 1926), after being arrested the day before by federal police while speaking at a public meeting in Chalchihuites in defense of religious freedom, he and three members of the Mexican Association for Catholic Youth— Manuel Morales, David Roldán Lara, and Salvador Lara Puente — were taken from the jail by soldiers, ostensibly to be transferred to the state capital, Zacatecas, for trial. After being taken out of town, the four men were shot on the side of the road by a firing squad. Reportedly, his last words were "Viva Cristo Rey y la Virgen de Guadalupe!" ("Long live Christ the King and the Virgin of Guadalupe!")

== Rodrigo Aguilar Alemán ==
Rodrigo Aguilar Alemán was born on May 13, 1875. After his seminary training in Ciudad Guzmán, Jalisco, he was ordained a priest in 1905. He was known for his literary abilities, writing both prose and poetry. He worked in various parishes. He was a Knight of Columbus and a member of Council 2330. He was the parish priest in Unión de Tula, Mexico. After a warrant was issued for his arrest, he took refuge at the Colegio de San Ignacio in Ejutla, where he continued to celebrate Mass and administer the sacraments. Rather than escape when soldiers arrived, Father Aguilar Alemán remained at the seminary to burn the list of seminary students, and thus protect them from being known.

On October 28, 1927, the day after his arrest, Father Alemán was led to the main plaza of Ejutla for execution by hanging. He blessed his captors and gave them his pardon, giving his rosary to one of the executioners. His captors decided to toy with Father Alemán and put his convictions to the test. After placing the noose on his neck from the rope hanging on a mango tree, they repeatedly asked him, "Who lives?" expecting the answer "Long live the supreme government." Instead he shouted the Cristero motto: "Long live Christ the King and Blessed Mary of Guadalupe!" They pulled on the rope and suspended him briefly, then lowered him and asked again. This happened three times (with each time Alemán repeating the Cristero motto). The third time he was suspended, Father Alemán died. He was buried in the parish church at Tula.

== Agustín Caloca Cortés ==
Agustín Caloca Cortés was born in San Juan Bautista de Teúl on May 5, 1898. He attended the seminary in Guadalajara, Jalisco, but was sent back to his family when the building was sacked during the Mexican Revolution. He continued his studies in a clandestine auxiliary seminary. In 1919, he was able to return to Guadalajara and was ordained on August 15, 1923. His priestly assignment was to the parish of Totatiche and to the prefecture of the seminary.

Government troops closed in to close down the seminary in late May 1927. Fr. Caloca Cortés directed the students to flee to safety and he tried to do the same, but he was captured by a group of soldiers. He was held in the jailhouse of Totatiche, together with Fr. Cristóbal Magallanes. General Goñi ordered his transfer to Colotlán, where Caloca was executed by firing squad in the burned city hall building on May 25, 1927. His heart was found to be incorrupt when his body was returned to the parish of Totatiche in 1933.

== Román Adame Rosales ==
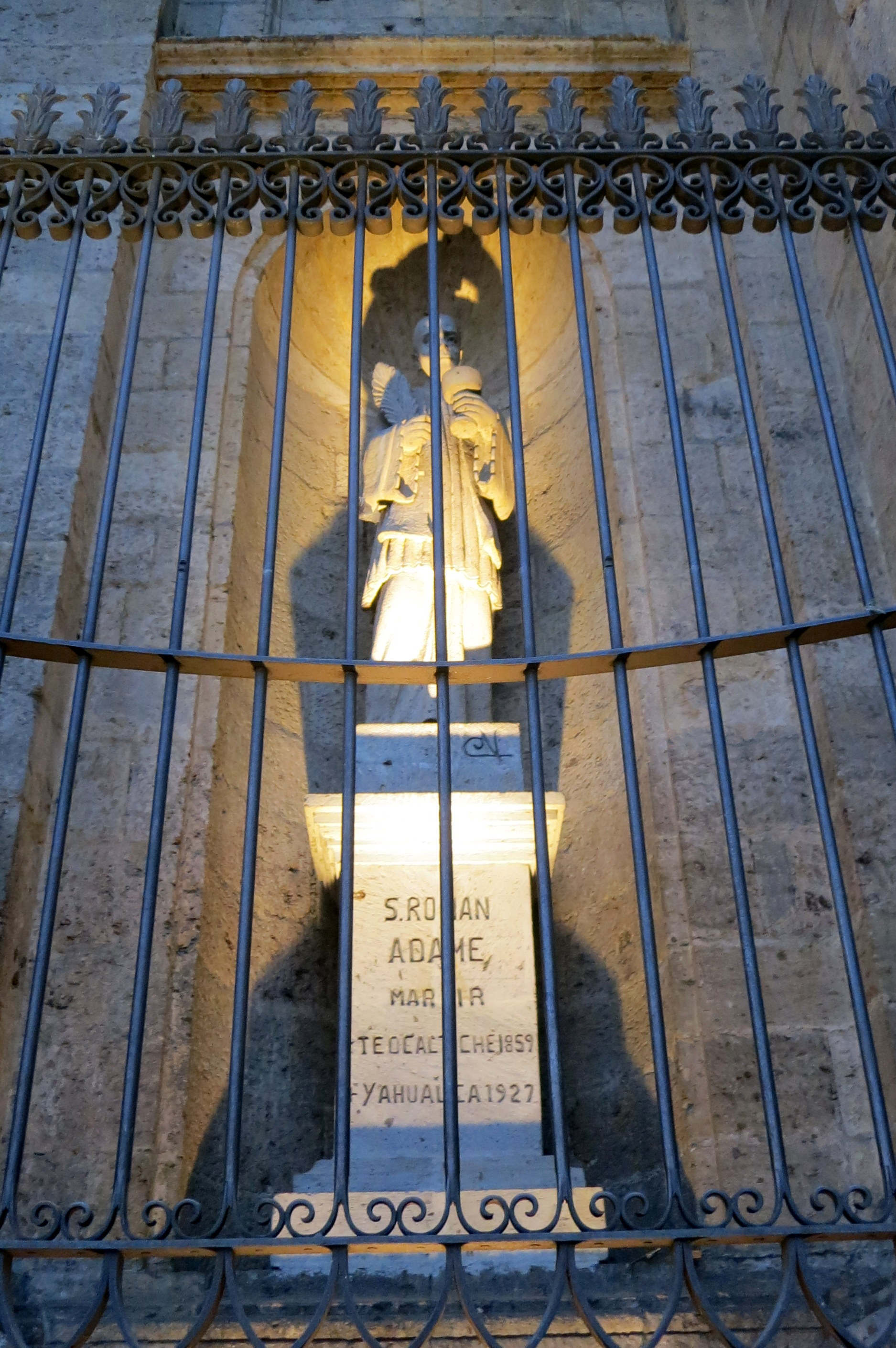
A statue of Román Adame Rosales on the exterior of Catedral de la Asunción de María Santísima in Guadalajara.

Román Adame Rosales was born on February 27, 1859. He studied for the priesthood in Guadalajara, Jalisco, and was ordained on November 30, 1890. He worked in various parishes, showing a profound dedication to the Blessed Virgin Mary and to catechesis, directing spiritual exercises, and parish schools. He founded the association "Daughters of Mary and Nocturnal Adoration". He built numerous chapels on the ranches. When the Calles Law forced the closing of the churches, he continued his ministry in private houses.

Adame was captured by government forces and tortured. He was taken to Yahualica, where he spent several days tied up, without food and water. On April 21, 1927, he was taken to an open grave, where he was executed by firing squad. His remains were later disinterred and brought to Nochistlán.

== Atilano Cruz Alvarado ==
Atilano Cruz Alvarado was born in Teocaltiche on October 5, 1901. He worked as a ranch hand for his family until the parents decided to send him to Teocaltiche to learn to read and write. There he discovered his vocation and entered a clandestine seminary in 1918. Two years later, he was sent to Guadalajara to finish his training. He was ordained on July 24, 1927, and sent to Cuquío a year later, where the parish was being run from a ranch house, "Las Cruces". There, on June 29, 1928, he joined his pastor, Justino Orona Madrigal, and they prayed and discussed the situation in their parish.

In the early dawn of July 1, he was apprehended by a squad of soldiers. In the jail where he was held, Fr. Orona Madrigal and his brother were there, covered with wounds. While he was praying at the foot of the bed, the soldiers shot Fr. Cruz. His still living body was thrown onto the porch together with Fr. Orona. The two were then taken to Cuquío, where their bodies were dragged through the central square, during which they died.

== Miguel de la Mora ==
Father Miguel de la Mora of Colima was a member of the Knights of Columbus, Council 2140. Along with several other priests, he publicly signed a letter opposing the anti-religious laws imposed by the government. He was soon arrested and, with his brother Regino looking on, he was executed without a trial by a single shot from a military officer as he prayed his rosary on Aug. 7, 1927.

== José Dionisio Luis Padilla Gómez ==
Luis Padilla Gomez was born on 9 December 1899 in Guadalajara, Jalisco, Mexico. He was an active member of the Catholic Association of Mexican Youth (ACJM) and worked closely with Anacleto Gonzalez Flores in the activities of the Association, helping the poor children and youth in a special way. The young man, known to all as Luis, spent much time praying before the Blessed Sacrament and had a deep devotion to the Blessed Virgin Mary.

On the morning of April 1, 1927, Luis was arrested in his home, together with his mother and one of his sisters. He was repeatedly beaten and insulted, then sentenced to execution. After arriving at the Colorado jail, Luis met Anacleto and the others. He told Anacleto that he wanted to go to confession. But Anacleto told the young man, "No, brother, now is not the hour to confess, but to request pardon and to pardon our enemies. God is a Father and not a judge, the One who gives you hope. Your own blood will purify you". Luis knelt down in prayer, as the executioners' bullets riddled his prostrate body.

== See also ==
- Cristero War
- Rafael Guízar Valencia
- List of canonizations
- Martyrs of the Spanish Civil War
