= EXN =

EXN may refer to:

- Exin (ICAO airline code: EXN) a Polish airline
- Exton railway station (rail station code: EXN) in England
- Discovery Channel Canada, formerly also using "EXN.net" in the 2000s
- Excellon Resources Inc. Canadian mining company
