= La Negra mine =

Silver mine in Mexico

- Location in Mexico La Negra mine (Querétaro)
- Location: Querétaro, Mexico; 20.835173°N 99.522369°W
- Products: Silver
- Opened: 1970
- Company: Orion Resource Partners

La Negra mine is a silver mine in the Mexican state of Querétaro, owned by Excellon Resources.

== Description ==
La Negra is a silver mine in Querétaro, Mexico. The mine has thirteen known ore bodies, overwhelmingly of silver, but also with smaller quantities of gold, zinc and lead.

The mine has a processing mill that can process 3,000 tons-per-day. Tailings from the mine are held behind five tailings dams. The dams are located upstream of the Maconí River which, which after five kilometers reaches the Moctuzuma River.

When active, it produced up to three-million ounces of silver-equivalent per year.

In 2023, the mine had 15.1 million ounces of silver in reserves.

== History ==
The mine started operating in 1970 and was owned by Industriales Peñoles S.A. de C.V. at the time. Production stopped in 2000.

Aurcana Corporation became the primary owner of the mine in 2006, expanding its share of ownership to over 99% in 2012. In 2009, production of ore was 1,000 tonnes per day, increasing in 2012 to 2,500 tonnes per day and 3,000 tonnes per day in 2013. In 2014, Aurcana increased quarterly production to 997,530 ounces, and facing reducing global silver prices, improved efficiency by reducing the workforce size.

The 2013 study Influencia de Jales Mineros Sobre El Río Maconí, Queretaro, y Evaluación Del Proceso de Atenuación Natural Por Dispersión (English: Influence of mining tailings on the Maconí River, Queretaro, and evaluation of the natural attenuation process by dispersion), published in Boletín de la Sociedad Geológica Mexicana (the journal of the Mexican Geological Society) reported that "concentration in the water-soluble fraction exceeds 0.5 mg/L (permissible level indicated in NOM-147)" (Note: See External links) downstream of tailings dam number three.

In 2023, the mine was purchased from Dalu S. à r. l. by Excellon Resources for $50 million.

== See also ==
- Mining in Mexico
