= San Juan de Sabinas Municipality =

Municipality in the Mexican state of Coahuila

San Juan de Sabinas
- Municipality
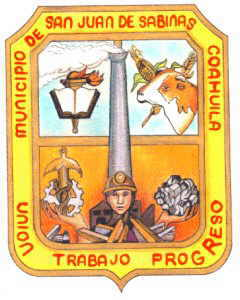
- Coat of arms

- Municipality of San Juan de Sabinas in Coahuila

- Location in Mexico
- Coordinates: 27°55′45″N 101°18′12″W
- Country: Mexico
- State: Coahuila
- Municipal seat: Nueva Rosita

Area
  - Total: 735.4 km^{2} (283.9 sq mi)
- Elevation: 382 m (1,253 ft)

Population (2005)
  - Total: 40,115

San Juan de Sabinas is one of the 38 municipalities of Coahuila, in north-eastern Mexico. The municipal seat lies at Nueva Rosita. The municipality covers an area of 735.4 km^{2}.

As of 2005, the municipality had a total population of 40,115.

In 1908, it was the scene of the Mina Rosita Vieja disaster, the worst disaster in Mexico's coal mining history.
