= Nueva Rosita =

Town in the Mexican state of Coahuila

- Municipal seat
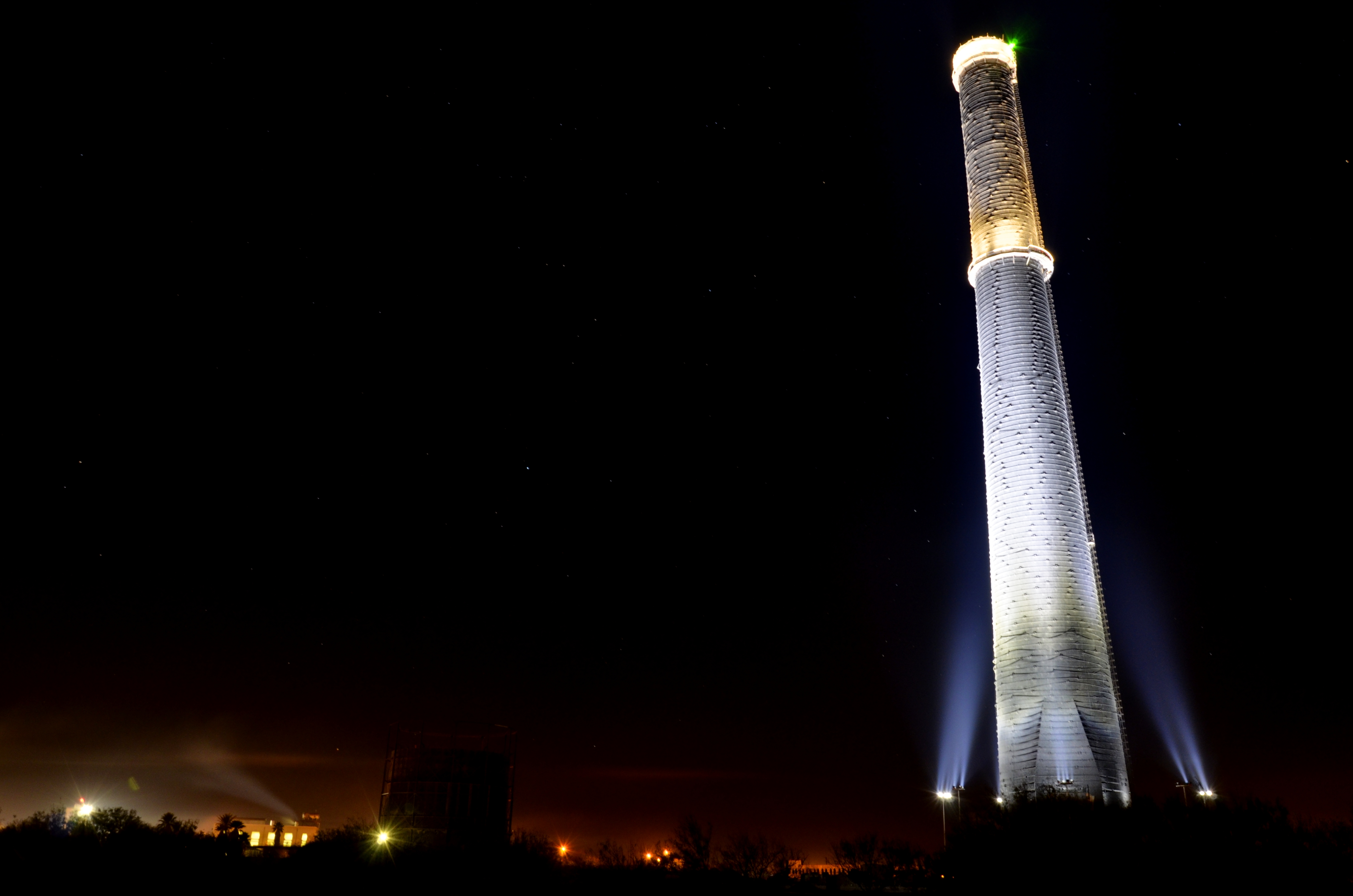
- Chimney of Nueva Rosita

- Location in Mexico Nueva Rosita (Coahuila)
- Coordinates: 27°56′14″N 101°13′02″W
- Country: Mexico
- State: Coahuila
- Municipality: San Juan de Sabinas

Nueva Rosita is a town in the northeastern part of the state of Coahuila in northern Mexico. It lies about 11 km (7 mi) northwest of the city of Sabinas on Federal Highway 57, and serves as the municipal seat of San Juan de Sabinas municipality.

In 1990 the town was recorded as having a population of 36,284. The town was initially developed in the 1930s. It remains today an important manufacturing centre for the north of Mexico.

The area is the site of a coal mine owned by Grupo México. On February 19, 2006, an explosion occurred in the mine, trapping more than 60 miners underground.

== Demographics ==
The census of 2005 reported a population of 40,115 for the municipality of San Juan de Sabinas, of whom 36,639 lived in the community of Nueva Rosita. The municipality has an area of 735.4 km^{2} (283.94 sq mi). Its second-largest town (population 1,431) is also named San Juan de Sabinas. The main ethnic group are mestizo (mixed European and Amerindian) and European.
