= La Platosa mine =

Silver mine in Mexico

- Location within Mexico Location within Durango
- Location: Bermejillo, Mapimí Municipality,Durango,Mexico; 25.92748°N 103.65815°W
- Products: Silver
- Company: Excellon Resources

La Platosa mine is a silver mine located at Bermejillo in the Mapimí Municipality of Durango state, Mexico owned by the Canadian company Excellon Resources.

== Description ==
La Platosa is a silver mine that ranks among Mexico's highest grade silver mines. The mine is located in near La Sierrita, on land owned by the Ejido La Sierrita community.

== History ==
The mine's owners have been accused of failing to build a water treatment plant by the Ejido La Sierrita community. The community submitted two complaints to the Government of Canada including one to the Extractive Sector CSR Counsellor. The complaints follow 2012 protests and road blockages.

After a vote on July 5 2022 workers the mine formed the Platosa Union. The union undertook industrial action in March 2022, after unsuccessful requests for a wage rise. Union members accused Excellon Resources subsidiary Servicios San Pedro of harassment. At the time the company reported draining problems, challenges from the regulatory environment and global precious metal prices.

Later in 2022, the company announced plans to close the mine, in the third quarter of the year, citing disputes with the worker's union and global metal prices.

== See also ==
- Mining in Mexico
