= David Roldán Lara =

Mexican Catholic martyr and saint (1902–1926)

Saint David Roldán Lara
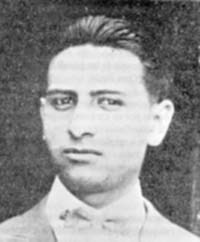

Martyr of the Cristero War
- Born: 2 March 1902; Chalchihuites, Zacatecas, Mexico
- Died: 15 August 1926 (aged 24); Chalchihuites, Zacatecas, Mexico
- Honored in: Catholic Church
- Beatified: 22 November 1992, St. Peter's Square, Vatican City by Pope John Paul II
- Canonized: 21 May 2000, St. Peter's Square, Vatican City by Pope John Paul II
- Feast: 21 May (Saints of the Cristero War); 15 August

David Roldán Lara (2 March 1902 – 15 August 1926) was a Mexican layman who was killed during the Cristero War. A pro-Catholic activist during the anticlerical period under President Plutarco Elías Calles, he was captured by government forces, and was executed for refusing to renounce his position. Roldán was canonized by Pope John Paul II on 21 May 2000 as one of 25 Martyrs of the Cristero War.

== Biography ==
=== Early life and education ===
David Roldán Lara was born on 2 March 1902

in Chalchihuites, Zacatecas, Mexico. He was baptized later that month at the local parish church. His father, Pedro Roldán Reveles, died when David was one, forcing his mother, Reinalda Lara Granados, to raise him and his brothers on her own. He attended Catholic schools and was an altar boy.

He entered the seminary of the Archdiocese of Durango in Durango City, but dropped out to support his struggling family.

=== Adulthood and religious activism ===
After leaving the seminary, Roldán became engaged, and worked at a local mine, where he was held in esteem by his fellow miners. He assisted the priest Luis Batiz Sáinz in directing Catholic Action of Mexican Youth, a group which he was president of until 1925. He was also vice president of the National League for the Defense of Religious Liberty (LNDNR).

On 29 July 1926, the LNDNR hosted a meeting that drew a crowd of around 600 people, including its president, Manuel Moralez, Batiz, Roldán, and Salvador Lara Puente, his cousin and secretary of the organization. After the meeting, Batiz was arrested at his home by a group of soldiers. A few days later, the three LNDNR leaders, Moralez, Roldán, and Lara, met at Lara's home to discuss how to free Batiz through legal means. A group of soldiers broke into the home and arrested the three men, imprisoning them in the town hall, where they were beaten and tortured.

=== Death ===
After several days of imprisonment, on 15 August 1926, Batiz, Moralez, Roldán, and Lara were taken out of their cells by a group of soldiers. At about noon of that day, the four men were loaded into two cars, and told that they were being taken to the state capital of Zacatecas City to explain their position to government officials. Instead of driving to the capital, the soldiers stopped the car in the mountains near Chalchihuites, and the prisoners were taken out. The soldiers accused the four men of conspiring to revolt against the government, and were offered freedom if they acknowledged the legitimacy of Mexican President Plutarco Elías Calles' anti-religious laws, which all four refused to do.

After the men refused to denounce their position, Martinez and Batiz were brought forward and shot. The two teenaged cousins, Roldán and Lara, were then called forward and led about 170 feet away from the bodies of Martinez and Batiz. According to witnesses, they walked serenely towards the spot, reciting an act of love. After crying out, "Long live Christ the King and Our Lady of Guadalupe!," they were shot by a firing squad. One soldier walked over to Roldán, who was close to death, and gave him a coup de grâce.

== Canonization ==
Roldán, along with the other 24 Martyrs of the Cristero War, was declared Venerable on 7 March 1992 by Pope John Paul II, with a decree of martyrdom. The group was beatified on 22 November 1992 by Pope John Paul II, and then canonized by him on 21 May 2000.

The collective feast day of the Martyrs of the Cristero War is 21 May, and the individual feast day of David Roldán Lara is 15 August, the anniversary date of his death.

== Legacy ==
Today, a parish church in the Diocese of Tampico is named for Saint David Roldán Lara.

== See also ==
- Saints of the Cristero War
- List of Mexican saints
