= Aurcana Corporation =

Canadian mining company

- Type: Public
- Genre: TSX-V: AUN
- Predecessor: Cane Silver Mines Limited
- Headquarters: Vancouver, British Columbia, Canada
- Key people: Kevin Drover
- Website: aurcana.com

The Aurcana Corporation is a Canadian mining company active in the United States and formerly active in Mexico. It is headquartered in Vancouver, British Columbia, Canada. It is listed on the TSX Venture Exchange.

== Assets ==
Through its Mexican subsidiary, Real de Maconi S.A. de C.V., it operated the La Negra mine, a silver, copper, zinc and lead mine in Querétaro, Mexico.

Through its American subsidiary, Silver Assets Inc., it operates a silver mine in Shafter, Presidio County, Texas, USA.

Through its American subsidiary, Ouray Silver Mines, Inc., it operates the Revenue-Virginius mine in Ouray, Colorado.
