= Mina Rosita Vieja disaster =

1908 coal mine disaster in Mexico

The Mina Rosita Vieja disaster occurred on February 27, 1908, when a huge early-morning explosion rocked the Rosita Vieja Coal Mine near the town of San Juan de Sabinas, Coahuila.

The explosion led to the deaths of 200 miners in shaft No. 2. The blast just before six a.m. on the 27th, at the shift change, was thought to be caused by firedamp. Most of those killed were Japanese immigrant laborers.

This event remains the most deadly coal mine disaster in Mexican history, followed by the Mina de Barroterán coal mine disaster of 1969.
