= Barroterán coal mine disaster =

Coal mining disaster in Mexico

Mina de Barroterán coal mine disaster occurred on March 31, 1969, and 153 miners were killed. This was the second worst disaster in Mexico's coal mining history, second only to the Mina Rosita Vieja disaster of 1908.

During the 19th, 20th and 21st centuries, nearly 900 miners died in explosions or floodings accidents related with the operation of coal mining in the state of Coahuila.
