= Sombrerete =

Sombrerete, Zacatecas
- City and municipality
- Sombrerete
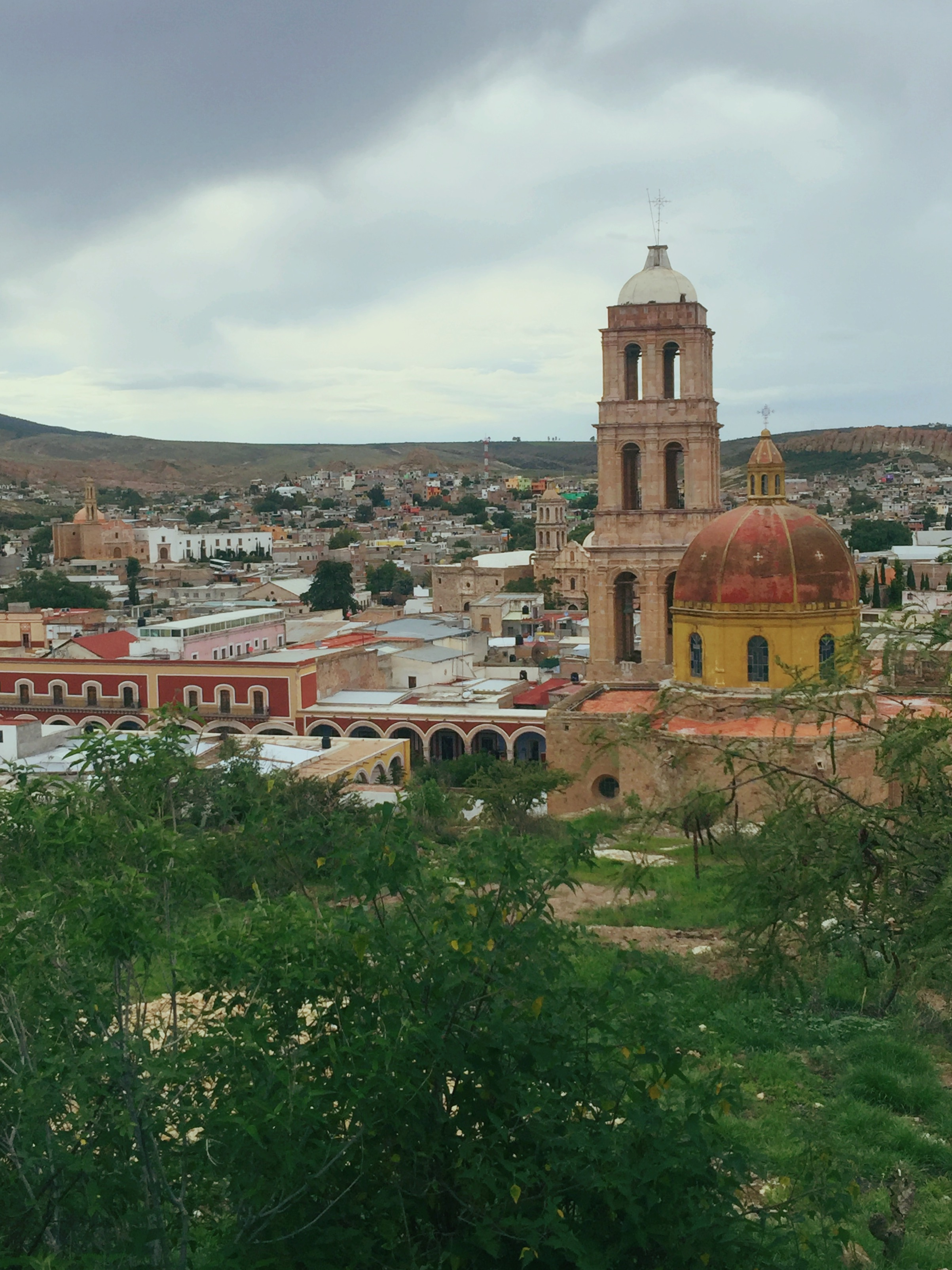
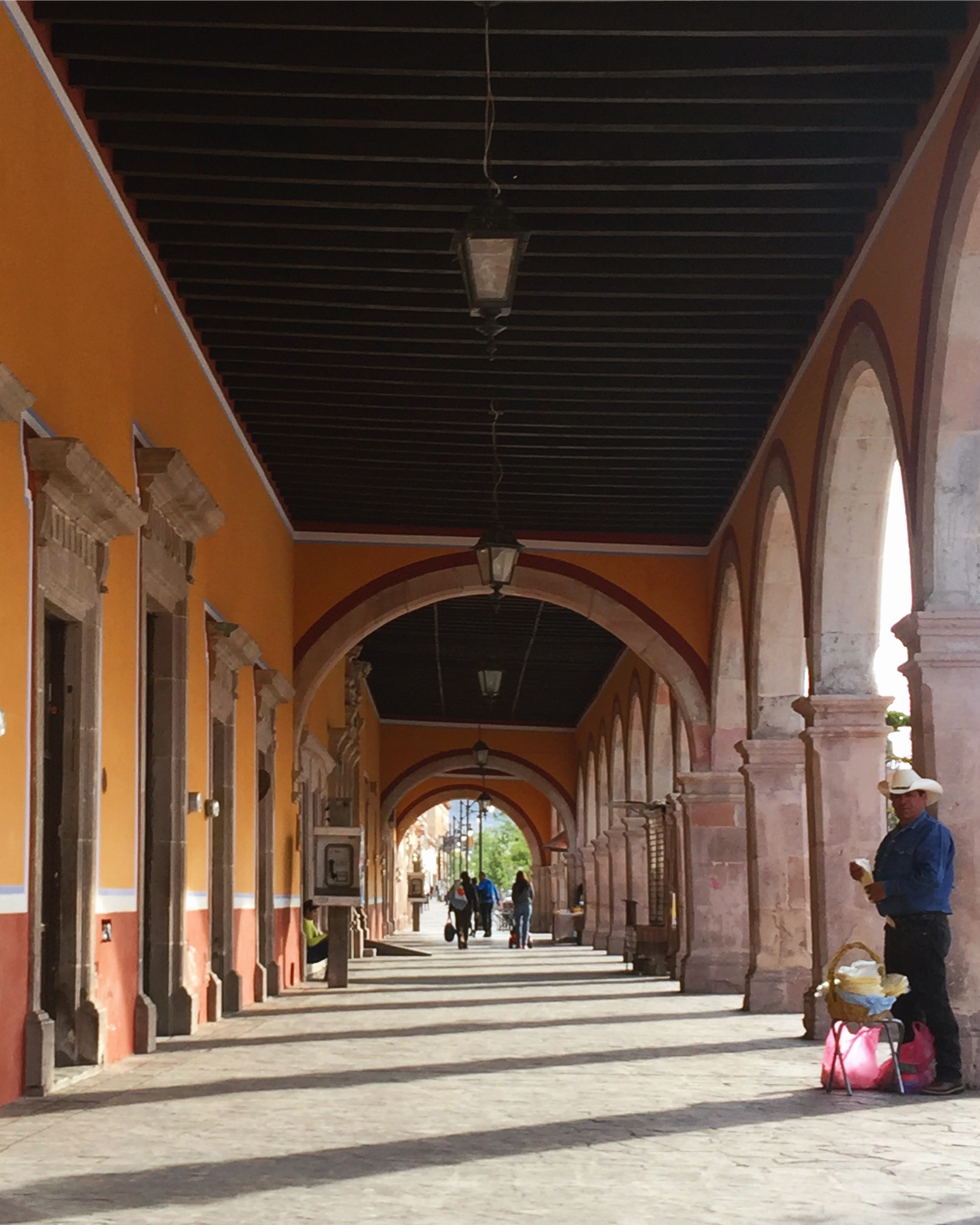
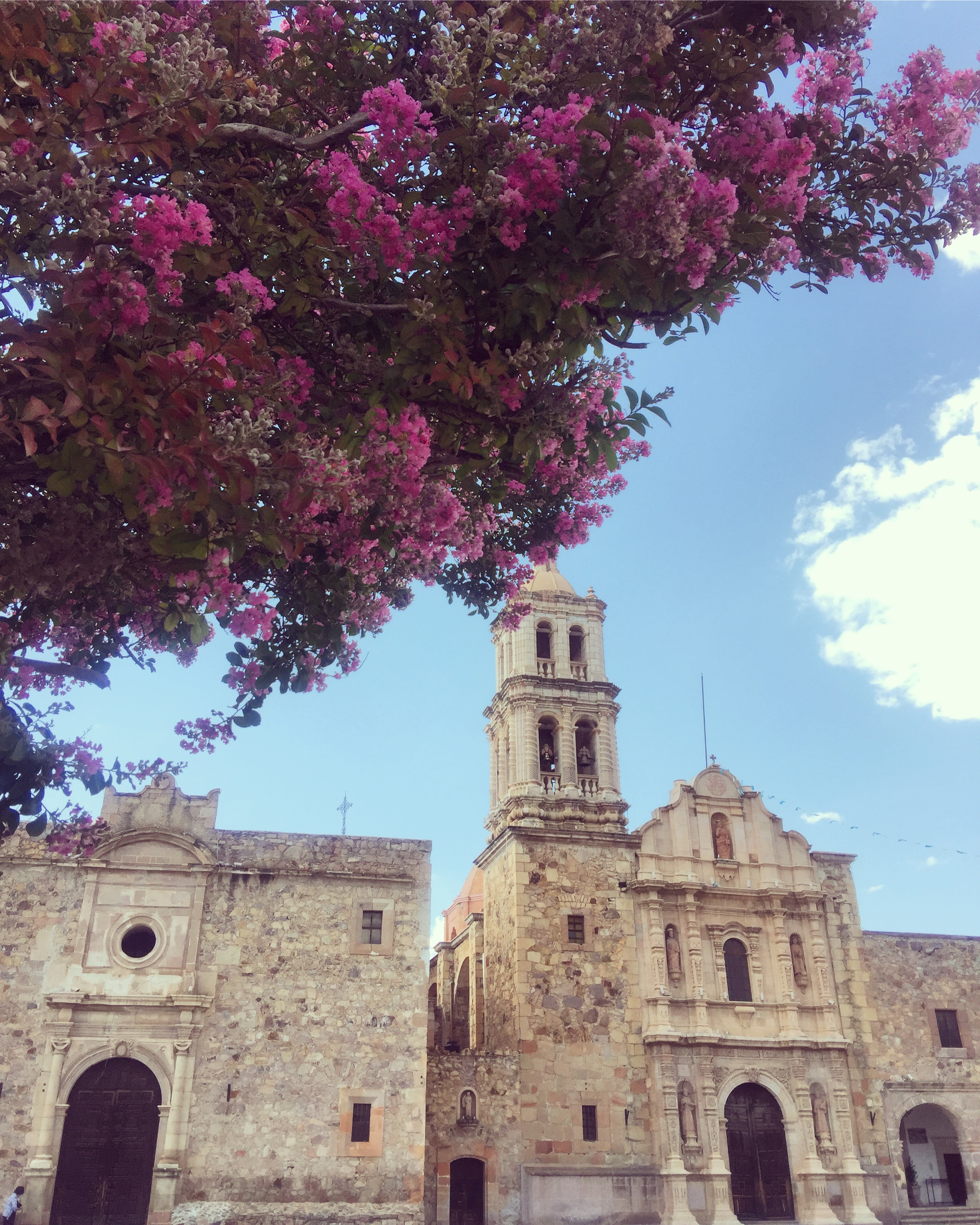
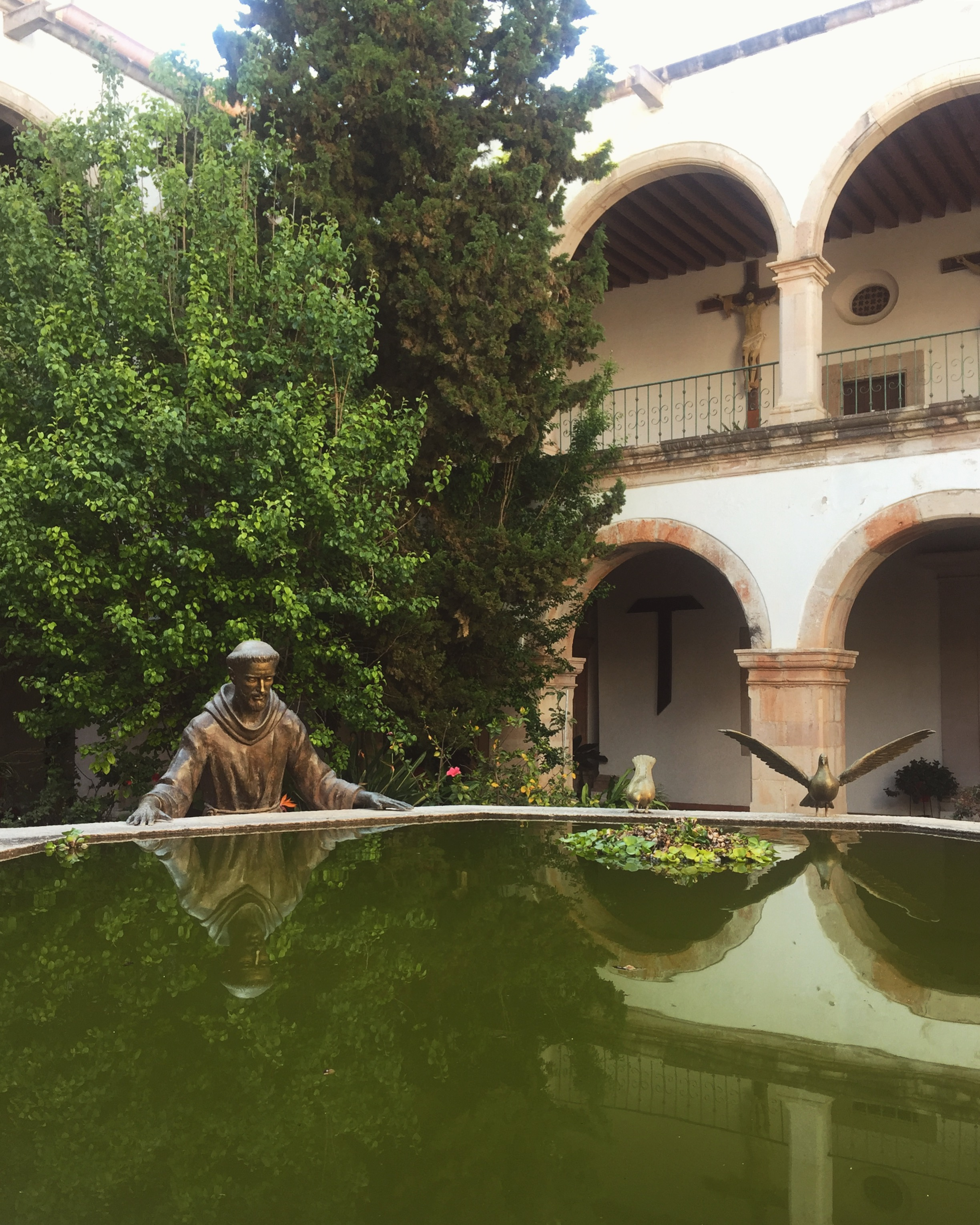
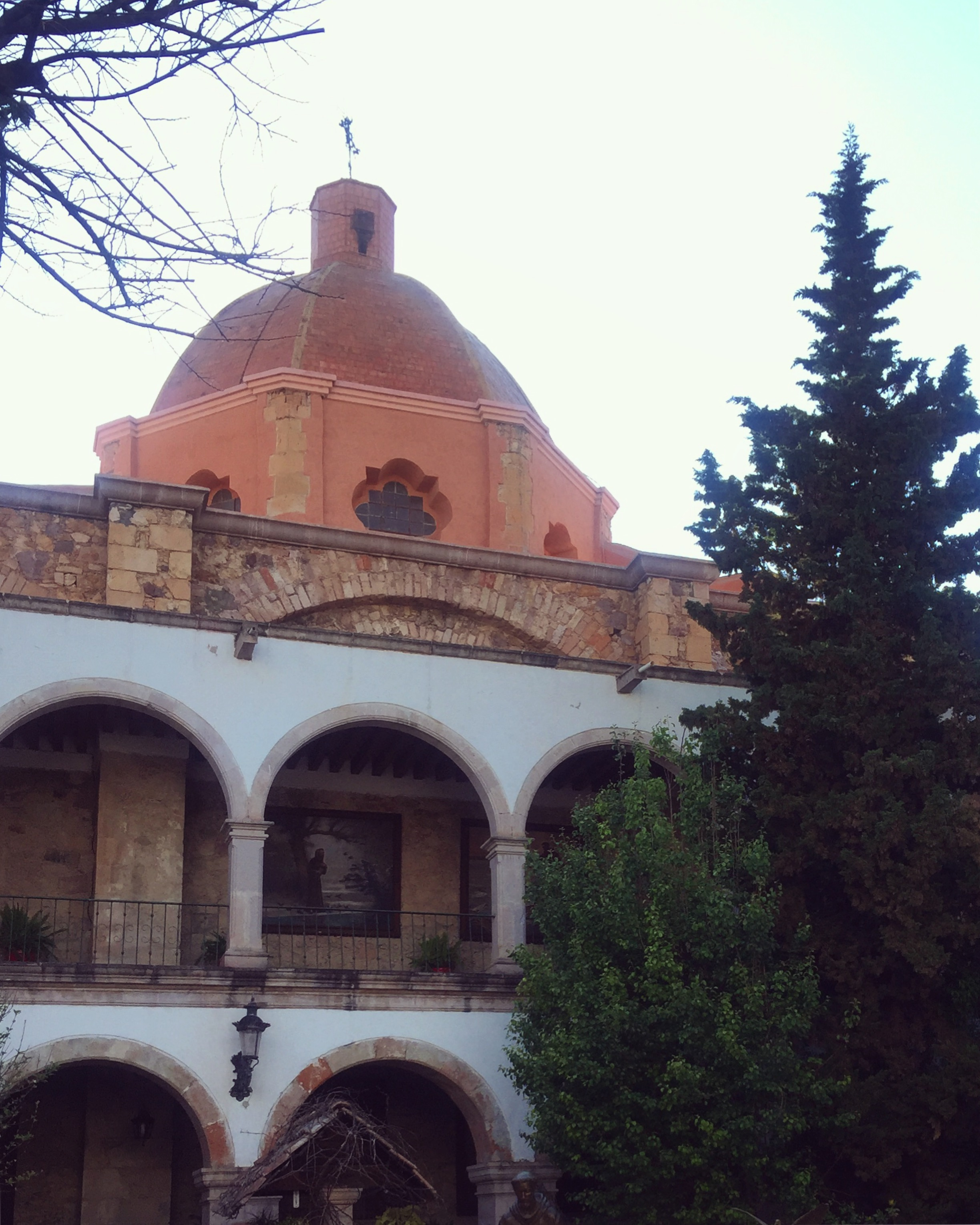
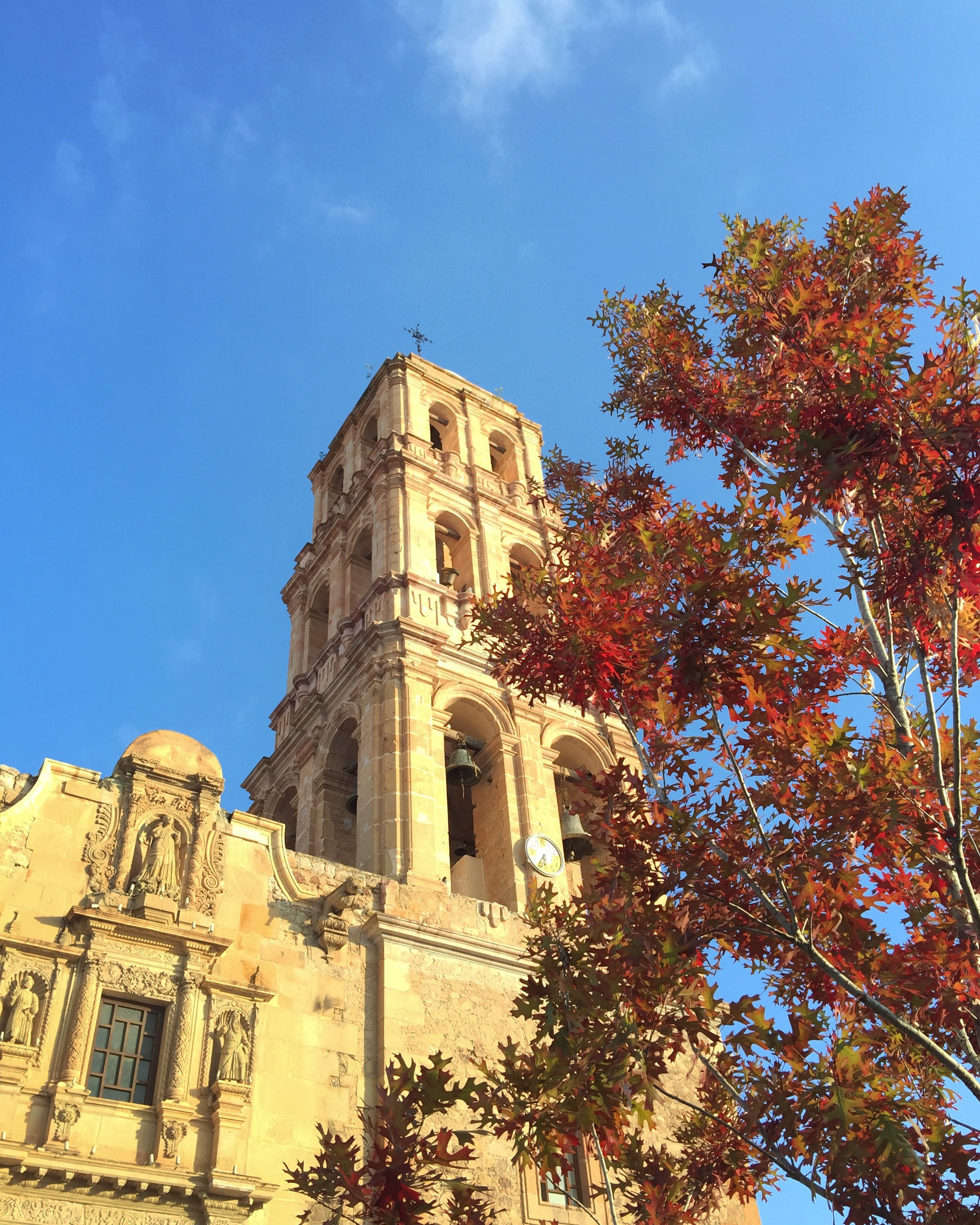
- Sombrerete

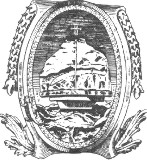
- Coat of arms

- Location in Mexico Sombrerete, Zacatecas (Mexico)
- Coordinates: 23°38′00″N 103°38′23″W
- Country: Mexico
- State: Zacatecas
- Founded: 1555

Government
  - Municipal President: Ramiro Hinojosa
- Elevation (of seat): 2,500 m (8,200 ft)

Population (2010) Municipality
  - Municipality: 58,201
- Time zone: UTC-6 (Central (US Central))
- Postal code (of seat): 99100
- Area code: 433

UNESCO World Heritage Site
- Official name: Ensamble of the city of Sombrerete
- Type: Cultural
- Criteria: ii, iv
- Designated: 2010 (32nd session)
- Reference no.: 1351-043
- Region: Latin America and the Caribbean

Sombrerete (Spanish: [sombɾeˈɾete]) is a town and municipality located in the northwest region of the Mexican state of Zacatecas.

Sombrerete was founded in 1555 by Spanish conquistador Juan de Tolosa as a mining center. Due to the wealth that the mines provided, it was one of the most important towns in New Spain. The historical center of Sombrerete, La Noria de San Pantaleón, and the Sierra de Órganos National Park were declared a UNESCO World Heritage Site in 2010, as a part of the Camino Real de Tierra Adentro (Royal Inland Road, or Silver Trail).

In 2012, Sombrerete was declared a Pueblo Mágico by the Mexican Secretariat of Tourism. The total population of Sombrerete in 2020 was 63,665 inhabitants, with 50.6% woman, and 49.4% men.

== Town ==
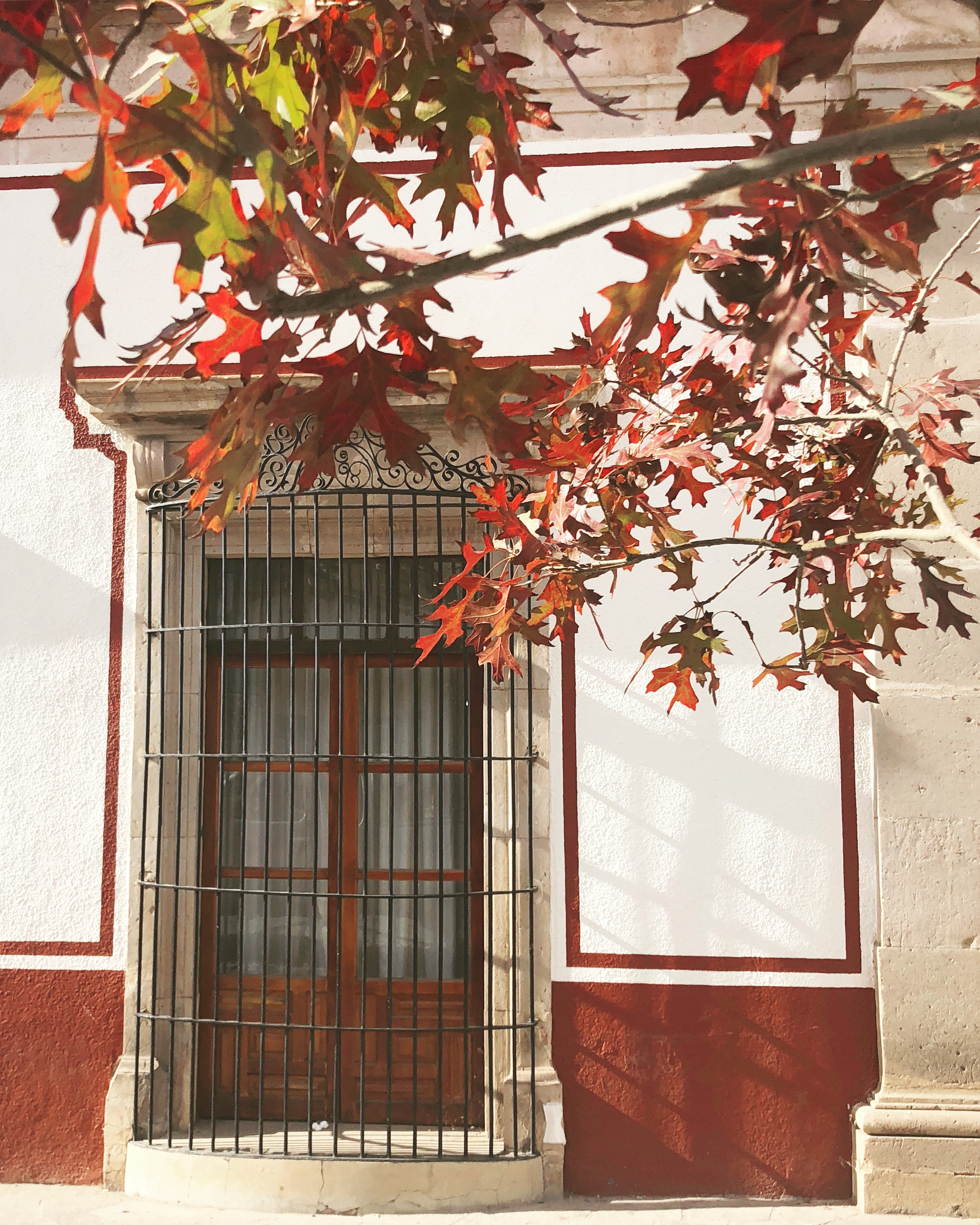
A typical façade in the historical center.

The town of Sombrerete maintains its colonial-era layout with wide streets that connect small streets and alleys dotted with plazas. The main plaza is surrounded by the government building. The Diezmo stream bisects the town.

It also maintains many of its colonial era monumental constructions. The largest of these is the San Mateo monastery complex, which includes a church dedicated to Saint Francis of Assisi (Third Order). The monastery was constructed in the 16th century and was the main religious center for the region until the 19th century. The main church has an altar made of gold-plated wood. There are also sanctuaries dedicated to Our Lady of Solitude, the Holy Cross, Saint Peter and Our Lady of Guadalupe, all constructed in the 18th century.

The construction of the Santo Domingo Church began in the 18th century, and it was one of twenty-two built in the state by Count Fernando de la Campo, along with the Santuario de Plateros. It is Baroque with the interior containing valuable religious art. It is also the final resting place of the count. Next to it is the Santa Rosa Monastery and in front is a public garden.

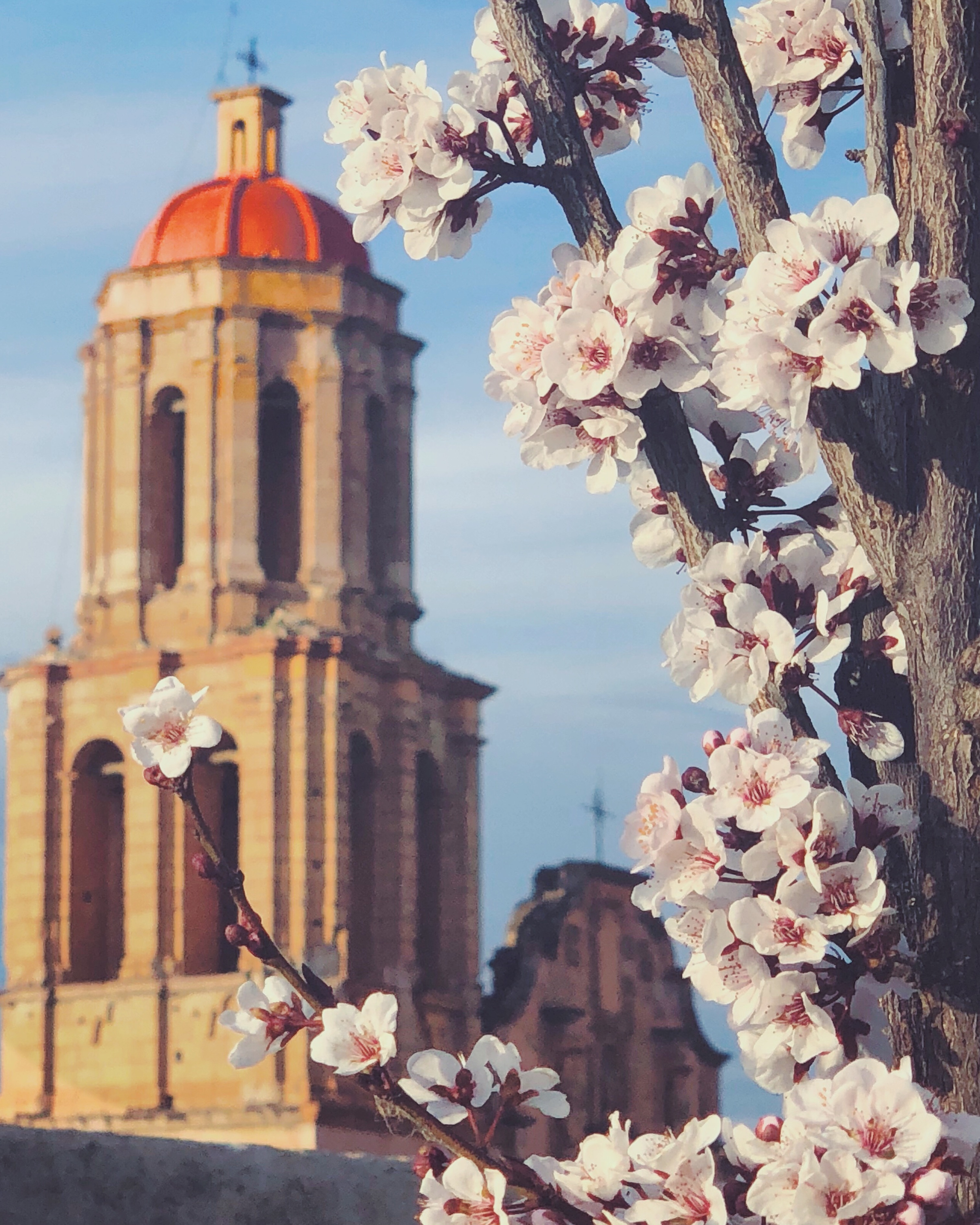
The Santo Domingo parish

The San Juan Bautista Church dates from 1777. Its facade is Baroque with three levels decorated with niches, sculptures and gargoyles. The interior contains a number of valuable paintings along with a main altar topped by an image of Our Lady of the Immaculate Conception. In its atrium, there is a bust of Benito Juárez.

La Capilla de la Candelaria is dedicated to an image brought from Seville, Spain, a figure of the Virgin Mary, made of wood donated by Juan de Tolosa in 1556. The small building has a stone altar, with its roof held up by fifty-two thick beams. Each year the image has its feast day.

The Santa Veracruz Chapel was built in the 16th century. Its interior is completely empty, without even pews. In the floor there are over a hundred graves of unidentified children, women and men. It is somewhat deteriorated as it has not been restored as of 2013.

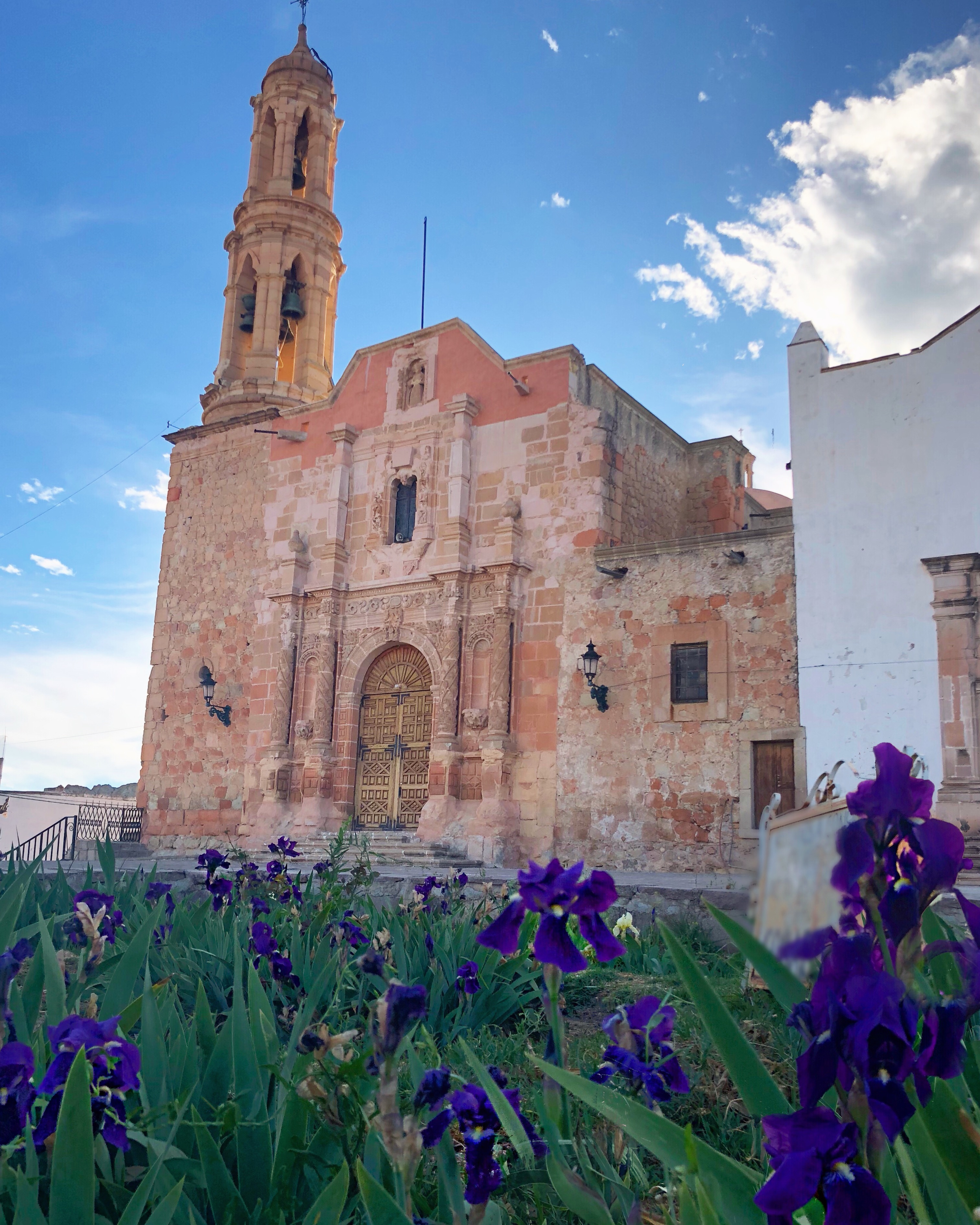
La Soledad church

La Soledad Church dates from the 18th century, and is distinguished by its Moorish bell tower and Churrigueresque facade.

The municipality has one museum which was opened in 2000. It contains exhibits that recount the economic, social and cultural development of the region beginning with the pre-Hispanic period.

The town has two main festivals. One celebrates its founding on June 6 and the other focuses on the Virgin of Candelaria in February. At festivals such as these, the most traditional music of the area, called tamborazo, is played. Another important event is the Noria de San Pantaleón Festival (July 27).

== Municipality ==
The town of Sombrerete acts as the local government for a number of other communities that surround it, extending over 3,571 km^{2}. Many of the smaller communities of the municipality were the sites of former hacienda mansions. The most important of these communities include Colonia González, Charco Blanco, San Jose De Mesillas, Colonia Hidalgo, Villa Insurgentes, Ignacio Zaragoza, Benito Juárez, and San Martín. These communities are dedicated to agriculture, livestock and some commerce. The municipality is bordered by the municipalities of Miguel Auza, Río Grande, Sain Alto, Fresnillo, Valparaíso, Jiménez del Téul, and Chalchihuites with the state of Durango to the west and north.

== Geography ==
The town and municipality of Sombrerete is located in the northwest of the state of Zacatecas, about 168 km from the state capital.

The region is between the Sierra Madre Occidental and the central highlands of Mexico. The municipality is in a valley is surrounded on all sides by small mountain ranges such as the Sierra de Sombrerete and the Sierra de Santa María with prominent elevations such as the Cerro Grande, Cerro Reyes, Cerro Sombreretillo, and Cerro Alto. The town has an altitude of about 2,300 meters above sea level with the highest elevations over 2,500.

=== Hydrography ===
The main river is the San Antonio-Barajas, which passes through the towns of Parade, Buenavista, Los Terreros, La Capillos, and Los Sauces. Other important streams are Grande-Las Adjuntas, El Pino-Linares, Los Mimbres, La Guera-Espiritu, Santo Loberos, San Juan, Milpillas, Zaragoza, Las Varas, Charco Blanco, La Batea, El Salto, and Peñuelitos. The main bodies of water are Charco Blanco, Dolores, Santiago, San Ignacio and La Honda.

=== Climate ===
For about half of the municipality, the climate is temperate and semi-moist with rain mostly in the summer. The other half is slightly drier than this. The average temperature for the municipality is 22.1 C and the average annual rainfall is 635.6mm.

Climate data for Sombrerete (1951–2010)
| Month | Jan | Feb | Mar | Apr | May | Jun | Jul | Aug | Sep | Oct | Nov | Dec | Year |
|---|---|---|---|---|---|---|---|---|---|---|---|---|---|
| Record high °C (°F) | 29.0 (84.2) | 32.0 (89.6) | 33.0 (91.4) | 36.0 (96.8) | 39.4 (102.9) | 38.0 (100.4) | 38.0 (100.4) | 37.8 (100.0) | 34.0 (93.2) | 34.0 (93.2) | 31.2 (88.2) | 29.0 (84.2) | 39.4 (102.9) |
| Mean daily maximum °C (°F) | 19.6 (67.3) | 21.4 (70.5) | 24.4 (75.9) | 27.1 (80.8) | 29.3 (84.7) | 28.5 (83.3) | 25.8 (78.4) | 25.2 (77.4) | 24.2 (75.6) | 23.7 (74.7) | 22.5 (72.5) | 19.8 (67.6) | 24.3 (75.7) |
| Daily mean °C (°F) | 11.5 (52.7) | 12.8 (55.0) | 15.4 (59.7) | 18.1 (64.6) | 20.4 (68.7) | 20.8 (69.4) | 19.2 (66.6) | 18.9 (66.0) | 18.0 (64.4) | 16.4 (61.5) | 14.3 (57.7) | 12.0 (53.6) | 16.5 (61.7) |
| Mean daily minimum °C (°F) | 3.3 (37.9) | 4.2 (39.6) | 6.3 (43.3) | 9.0 (48.2) | 11.6 (52.9) | 13.1 (55.6) | 12.7 (54.9) | 12.5 (54.5) | 11.8 (53.2) | 9.2 (48.6) | 6.0 (42.8) | 4.2 (39.6) | 8.7 (47.7) |
| Record low °C (°F) | −9.5 (14.9) | −8.3 (17.1) | −6.5 (20.3) | −4.5 (23.9) | 2.3 (36.1) | 2.0 (35.6) | 7.0 (44.6) | 2.5 (36.5) | 1.5 (34.7) | −2.3 (27.9) | −5.0 (23.0) | −14.4 (6.1) | −14.4 (6.1) |
| Average precipitation mm (inches) | 14.1 (0.56) | 24.3 (0.96) | 5.5 (0.22) | 4.9 (0.19) | 15.7 (0.62) | 73.6 (2.90) | 117.5 (4.63) | 122.6 (4.83) | 100.9 (3.97) | 43.7 (1.72) | 14.6 (0.57) | 15.0 (0.59) | 552.4 (21.75) |
| Average precipitation days (≥ 0.1 mm) | 2.6 | 2.4 | 1.3 | 1.5 | 4.0 | 10.5 | 15.5 | 16.0 | 12.5 | 6.3 | 2.3 | 3.0 | 77.9 |
| Average relative humidity (%) | 51 | 47 | 41 | 39 | 43 | 57 | 66 | 67 | 68 | 61 | 54 | 55 | 54 |
| Mean monthly sunshine hours | 239 | 237 | 282 | 281 | 295 | 257 | 236 | 236 | 206 | 246 | 256 | 238 | 3,009 |
Source 1: Servicio Meteorologico Nacional (humidity 1981–2000)
Source 2: Ogimet (sun 1981–2010)

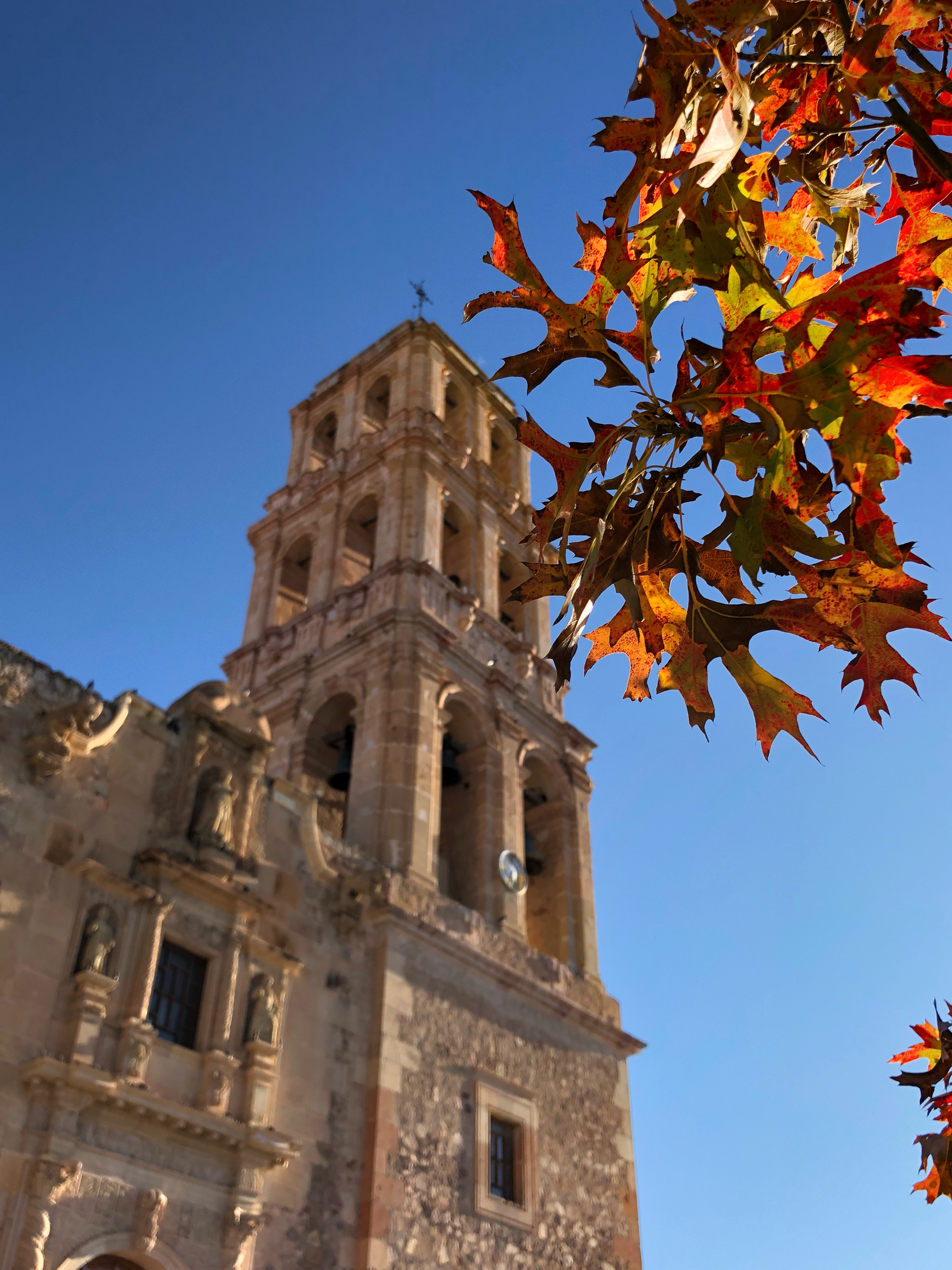
San Juan Bautista Parish

=== Flora and fauna ===
The most common type of vegetation is grass, on about a third of the territory and is used as animal feed. About twenty-six percent of the area is forested with pine, holm oak and oak. Dry areas with cactus are only two percent of the territory. The rest is under cultivation growing corn, beans, oats and wheat.

== Culture ==
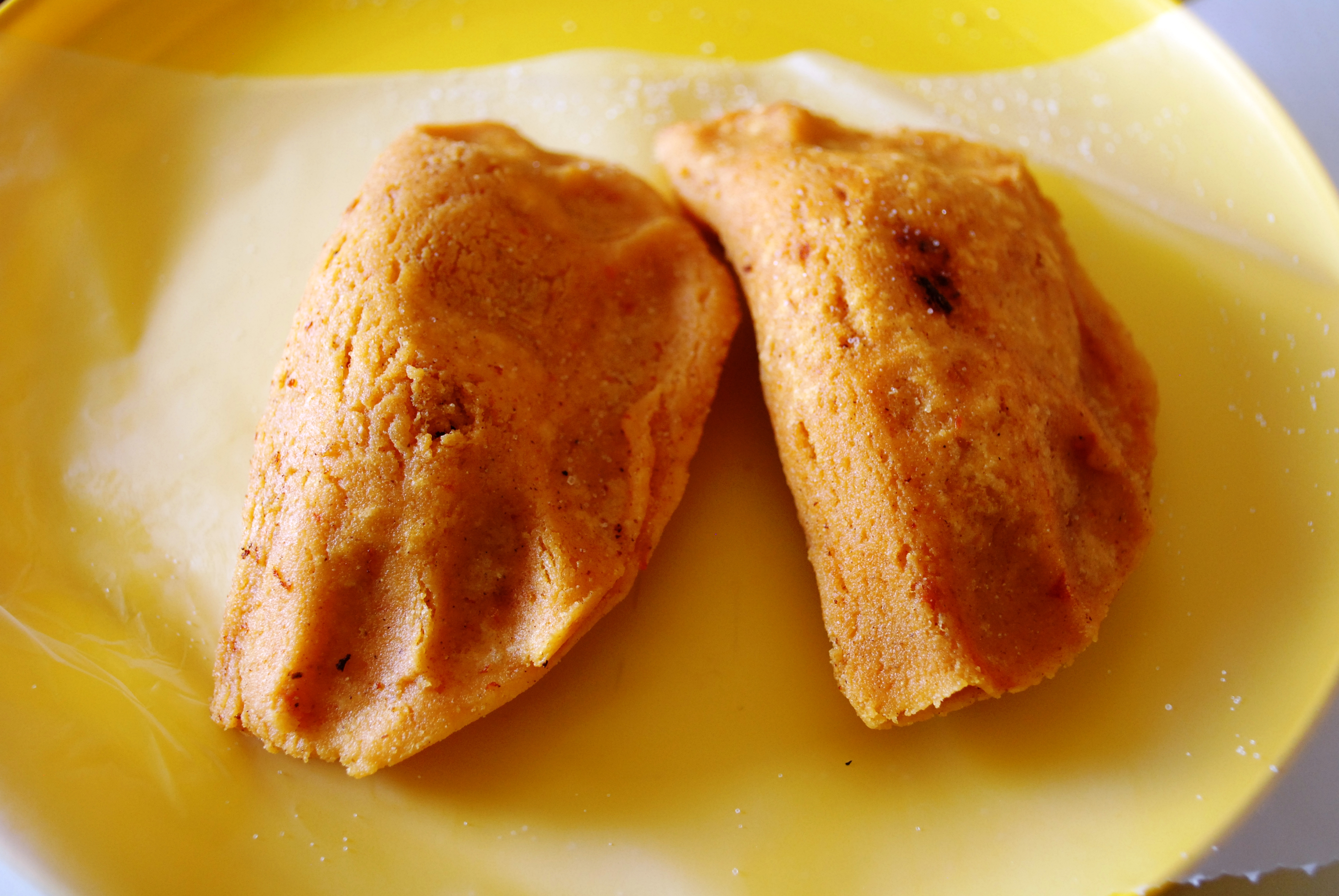
Brujitas

Sombrerete is one of the most traditional municipalities in Mexico, with much of the social calendar related to religious events. Local saints' days are popular festivities in the municipality, generally celebrated with religious rites, traditional dance and food and carnival rides. One of the local images is the Señor de los Trabajos (Our Lord of Work), said to provide aid in the search for work. On the night of this celebration there is a fireworks show and the burning of a tree in the Plaza San Francisco. In addition all of the surrounding peaks have crosses, brought up by people as an act of faith. It is also said that various religious relics are hidden in the Sierra de Órganos, along with treasure.

Typical dishes of the area are birria, pozole, and asado de boda (pork in a red chili pepper sauce with artisanal chocolate), similar to other areas in Zacatecas. Unique to Sombrerete is a street food called brujitas, fried turnovers made with thick corn dough and filled with beans or shredded meat. The name, which means 'little witches', refers to the idea that they "fly" out of the baskets when brought for sale to the market. Traditional drinks include fruit wines such as that from quince as well as rompope. Pan ranchero is a bread made with lard, baked in an adobe, brick or mud oven, most often prepared for Holy Week.

== Economy ==
The economy of the area is dependent on mining, ranching, and agriculture. The area is rich in minerals including silver with working mines. Since the 1940s, new deposits of mercury have been explored.

== History ==
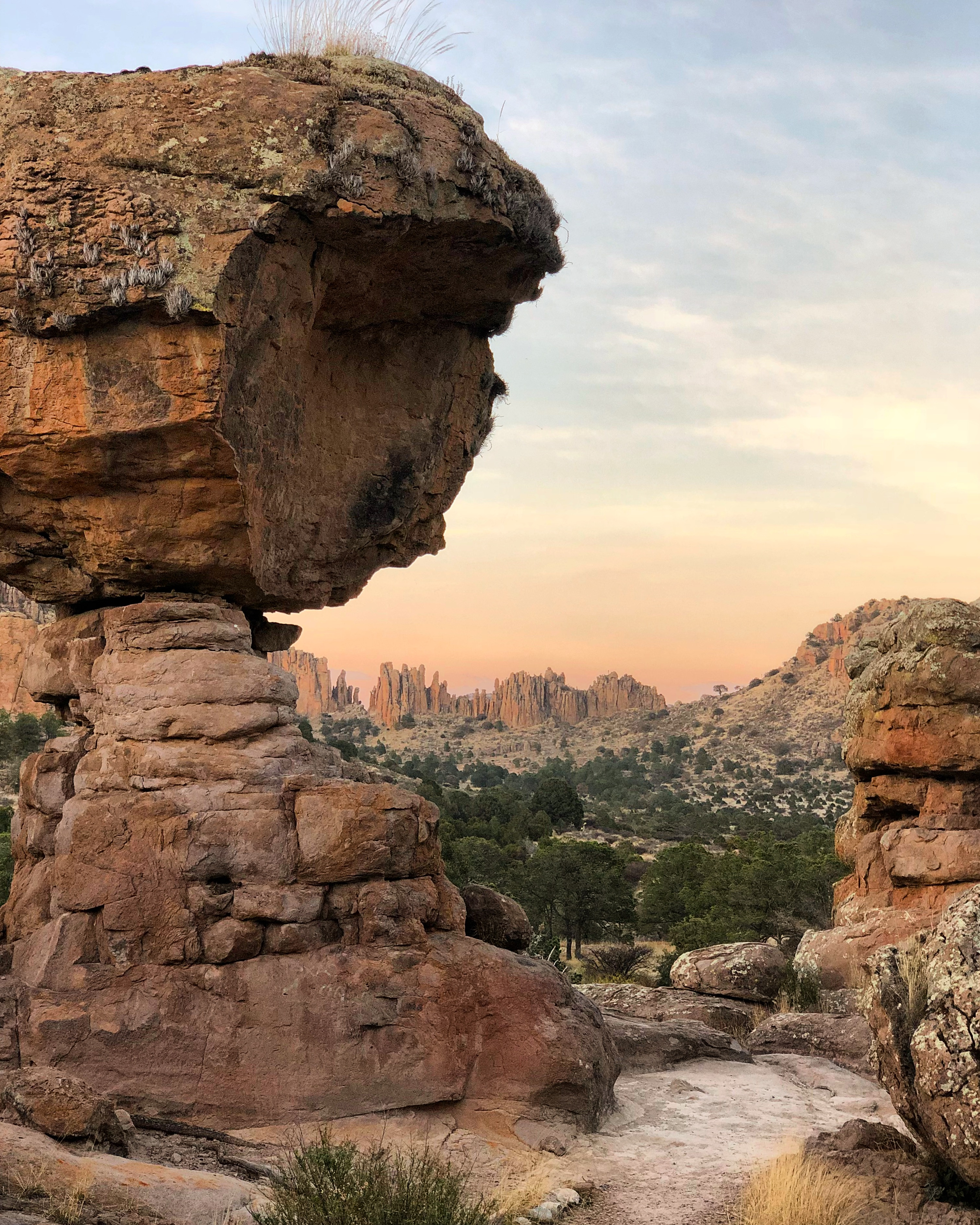
Rock formations at the Sierra de Organos National Park.

The earliest known culture of this region was that of the Chalchihuites, which existed from the late Pre-classic to about 900 AD, and was mostly sedentary and agricultural. It is not known why the settlements of this area were abandoned, but theories center on climate change, attacks from nomadic peoples and the fall of the large cities of the central valleys of Mesoamerica. From then until the arrival of the Spanish, the nomadic Chichimecas dominated the area.

In 1555, nine years after discovering silver in what is now the city of Zacatecas, Juan de Tolosa and a small group of Spaniards and allied indigenous arrived to find more. They settled near a small spring, calling the area Real y Minas de Sobrerete. The name came from Friar Jerónimo de Mendoza, who noticed that one of the mountains (Cerro de Sombreretillo) surrounding the valley looked like the common three-corner hat of the time, when viewed from the side.

In 1567, the San Mateo monastery was established as the region's main evangelical center. Soon after, the mines became important producers of gold, silver, lead, tin, and mercury, and by 1570, the settlement had grown enough to be officially declared a town by the Audiencia de Guadalajara, with the name Villa de Llerena.

During the colonial period the town and region continued to grow economically, with the addition of agriculture and ranching as important economic activities. However, mining still remained primary, with the two largest and most productive mines being Pabellón and Vetanegre, which made the Fagoaga family rich, giving them the title of the Marquesado del Apartado. The importance of the town of Sombrerete grew in the 17th century, with the establishment of a Royal House to collect taxes from as far as Chihuahua and Sinaloa. At the beginning of the 19th century, the town had a population of about 30,000 and a coin mint (casa de moneda) was established to create a coin called Vargas. Outside the mines, the various agricultural and ranching haciendas dominated the area until the beginning of the 20th century.

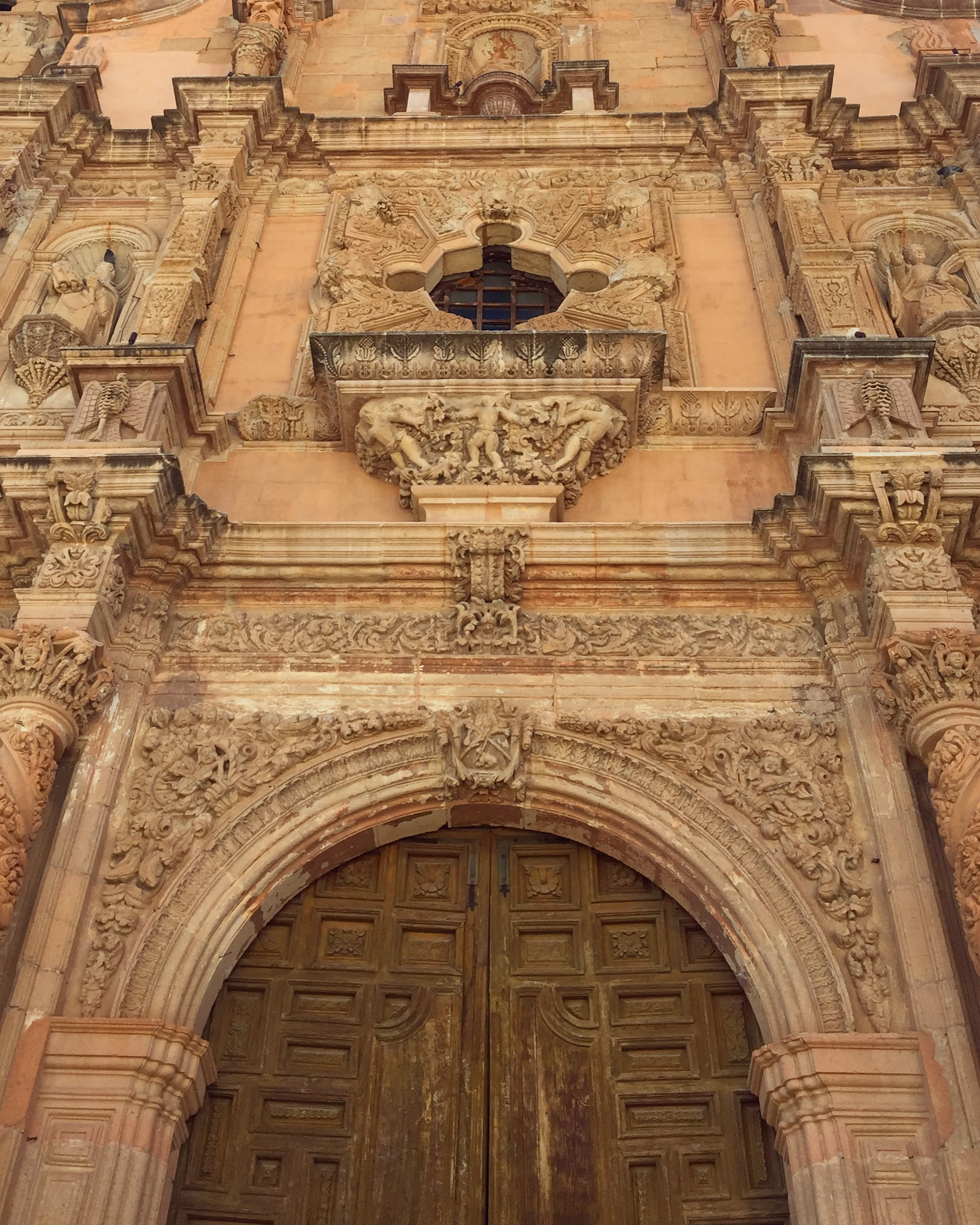
The Santo Domingo parish.

During the Mexican War of Independence a number of the miners sent financial support to the insurgents, especially to Guadalupe Victoria. In 1824, the town was declared a city by the state of Zacatecas and made a regional capital. The area remained politically important during the 19th century, but suffered an attack by Apaches from the United States in 1845. During the French Intervention and Reform War, it was the provisional capital of Zacatecas, with Benito Juárez passing through in 1866. The first newspaper, La Campana, was published in 1867. A major mining accident occurred in the San Amaro and San Francisco mines in 1897, with 116 dead.

When the Mexican Revolution broke out, the area's agriculture was known for its production of cotton and grain. The war brought attacks on both haciendas and mines, which deteriorated the economy even though the town was made a provisional capital of Zacatecas from 1913 and 1914, with a visit from Venustiano Carranza.

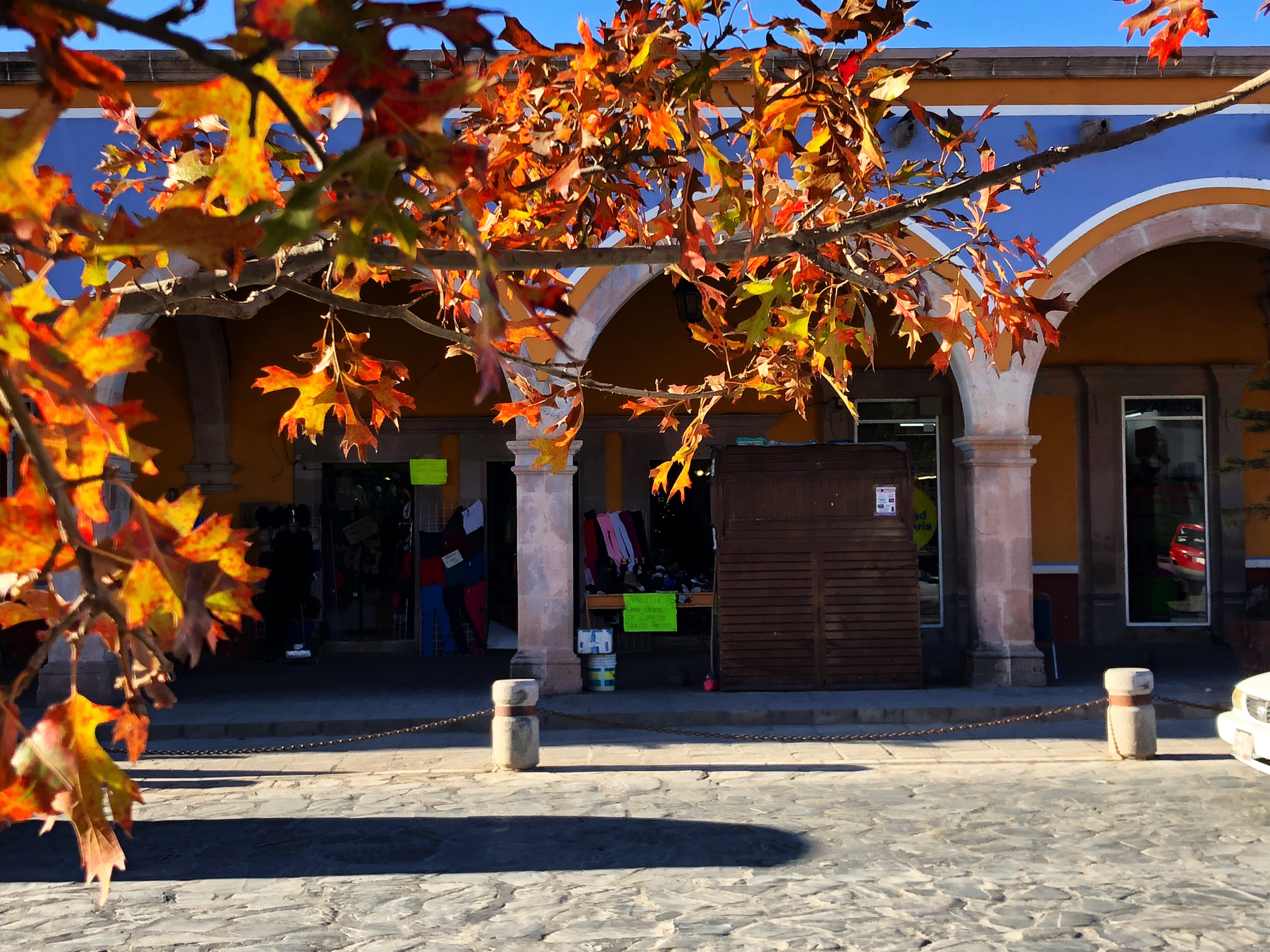
Los Portales

The end of the Revolution brought an end to the hacienda system and efforts by the new government to suppress the Catholic Church brought on the Cristero War, which mostly affected the rural communities of the area.

Since then the area remains an important mining and agricultural center for the state and a commercial center for the north of Zacatecas. Notable events since the early 20th century include the establishment of the Colegio de Sagrado Corazón de Jesús in 1947, a forty-hour snowfall in 1987, the declaration of sister city status with Llerena, Spain in 1992 and the founding of the Instituto Tecnológico de Zacatecas-Occidente in 2000.
