= Excellon Resources =

Canadian mining company

- Traded as: TSX-V: EXN
- Industry: Mining
- Headquarters: 10 King Street East, Suite 200, Toronto, Canada
- Key people: Shawn Howarth (CEO)
- Products: Silver

Excellon Resources is a Canadian mining company that operates the La Platosa mine and the La Negra mine silver mines in Mexico.

== Organization ==
Excellon Resources is a Canadian mining company that operates the La Platosa silver mine in La Sierrita, Mexico. In 2012, the company was led by CEO and president Brendan Cahill. In 2023, Shawn Howarth was the CEO.

It is based at 10 King Street East, Toronto.

== Activities and history ==
The company owns the La Platosa mine, one of Mexico's most silver rich mines. The mine operates at Durango on land owned by the Ejido La Sierrita community. The company was accused of failing to build a water treatment plant by the Ejido La Sierrita community. The community submitted two complaints to the Government of Canada including one to the Extractive Sector CSR Counsellor. In 2022, the company announced plans to close the La Platsoa mine, in the third quarter of the year, citing disputes with the worker's union and global metal prices.

In 2023, the company spent $50 million to purchase the La Negra silver mine in Querétaro, Mexico. The mine was previously owned by Dalu S.à r. l.

== See also ==
- Mining in Mexico
