= Chalchihuites Municipality =

Coordinates: 23°28′34″N 103°52′50″W

- Etymology: Emerald or precious stone (in Nahuatl)
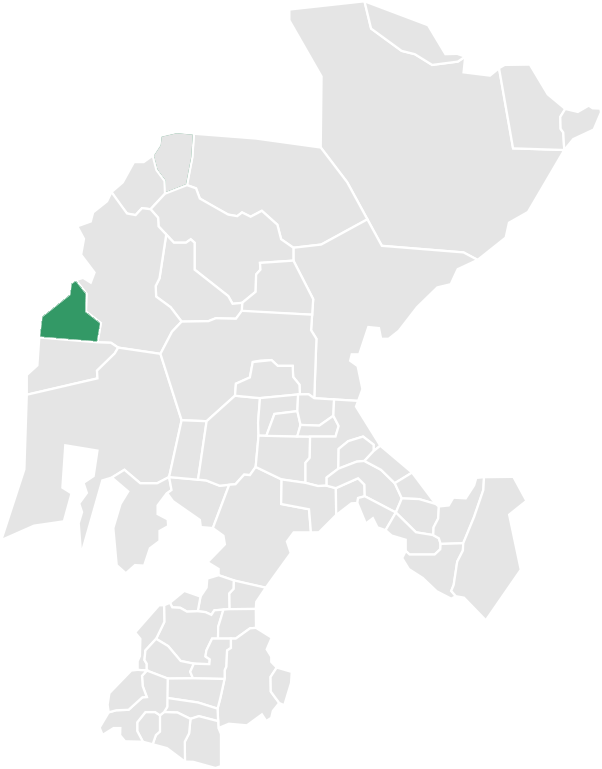
- Country: Mexico
- State: Zacatecas
- Municipal seat: Chalchihuites

Government
  - Municipal president: Lic. Laura Nava Reveles

Area
  - Total: 891 km^{2} (344 sq mi)
- Elevation: 2,270 m (7,450 ft)

Population
  - Total: 10,519
  - Density: 11.8/km^{2} (30.6/sq mi)
- Website: www.chalchihuites.gob.mx

Chalchihuites is a municipality in the Mexican state of Zacatecas. The archaeological site of Altavista, at Chalchihuites, is located 137 miles (220 km) to the northwest of the city of Zacatecas and 102 miles (164 km) southeast of the city of Durango. Located to the west of Sombrerete in the northwestern corner of the state of Zacatecas, it is believed that the site was a cultural oasis that was occupied more or less continuously from AD 100 to AD 1400.

== History ==
It was a Teotihuacano ceremonial center lying on the Tropic of Cancer. It has a number of important features, including petroglyphs, a processional walkway and the Hall of Columns. It has some of the best evidence for astronomical alignments at an archaeological site but remains poorly known.

The archaeologist Manuel Gamio referred to Chalchihuites as a "culture of transition" between the Mesoamerican civilizations and the so-called Chichimeca hunter-gatherers who lived in the arid plateau of central Mexico. Chalchihuites and La Quemada were both outposts of Mesoamerican settlement in an ecological and cultural frontier area. However, in this transition zone, climatic changes caused continual shifts in the available resource base, discouraging most attempts at creating permanent settlements.

It is also known for a large church that is located in its colonial center.

It founded by the Spanish captain Martin Perez in 1556 of a community from Guadalajara, in the first years after the conquest, became known as a mining center since 1591, when a group of Spaniards and Tlaxcalans were to be placed there by order of the viceroy Don Luis de Velasco. It is known that Don Lucas de Montealegre governed that colony as governor. The municipality dates from the same period as that of Sombrerete; From immemorial time it was part of the Mayor's Office of the same name, having constitutional character the year of 1824. Formerly it was called Real of Mines of the Valley of San Pedro de los Chalchihuites, they formed three districts or divisions: Chalchihuites, Tonalá and Nueva Tlaxcala, But in 1857 this last part, that belonged to Jalisco, was added to the State of Zacatecas by constitutional declaration.

== Demographics ==
The municipality of Chalchihuites, according to the 2020 Population and Housing Census, has 10,086 inhabitants, of which 4,892 are men and 5,194 are women.

=== Locations ===
The municipality includes a total of 69 localities in its territory. The main ones, considering their population from the 2020 Census, are:

Location	Population
Total Municipality	10 086
Chalchihuites	3 816
Gualterio	826
José María Morelos (San José de Gracia)	817
San José de Buenavista (San José de Abajo)	357
Hidalgo del Manto	337
Blue Stones	303

== Geography ==
The municipality of Chalchihuites is physically located in the Sierra Madre Occidental and Mesa Central. It has a territorial extension of approximately 891 km^{2} (344 sq mi), and limits to the north with the municipality of Sombrerete, to the south with the municipality of Jiménez of Teúl and to the west with the State of Durango. The word Chalchihuites is of Nahuatl origin and means Emerald or precious stone.

=== Climate ===
The climate is very hot during the summer months and cold in the winter. The site sits lonely in the badlands about four miles east of the town of Chalchihuites. It is also close to the colonial town of Zacatecas, which has a distinctive cathedral.

== Notable people ==
- Ricardo Moreno, a former boxer in the Super Featherweight division and ranked No. 76 on The Ring's list of 100 All time Greatest Punchers.
- Luis Moya Regis, a General of Francisco I. Madero during the Revolución Mexicana.
- Roberto Guadarrama, a band member of Los Bukis.
- Los Buchis De Chalchihuites, Zacatecas, a Mexican polka band.
