= 4th federal electoral district of Zacatecas =

Federal electoral district of Mexico

Zacatecas's 4th
- Electoral district of the Chamber of Deputies of Mexico

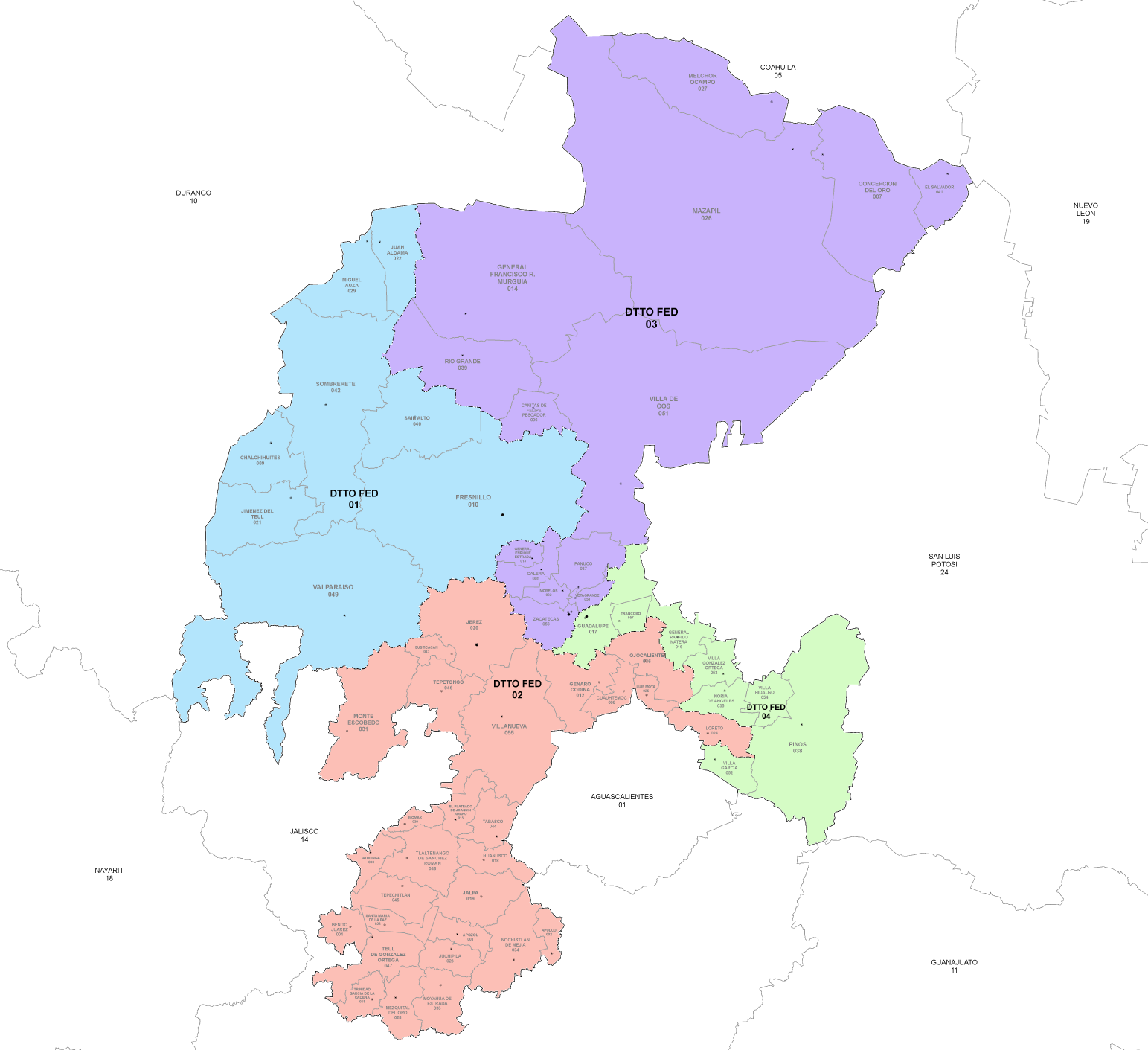
- 4th district since 2023

Incumbent
- Member: Ana Luisa del Muro García
- Party: ▌Labour Party
- Congress: 66th (2024–2027)

District
- State: Zacatecas
- Head town: Guadalupe
- Coordinates: 22°45′N 102°30′W
- Covers: General Pánfilo Natera, Guadalupe, Noria de Ángeles, Pinos, Trancoso, Villa García, Villa González Ortega, Villa Hidalgo
- PR region: Second
- Precincts: 313
- Population: 396,226 (2020 census)

The 4th federal electoral district of Zacatecas (Spanish: Distrito electoral federal 04 de Zacatecas) is one of the 300 electoral districts into which Mexico is divided for elections to the federal Chamber of Deputies and one of four such districts in the state of Zacatecas.

It elects one deputy to the lower house of Congress for each three-year legislative session by means of the first-past-the-post system. Votes cast in the district also count towards the calculation of proportional representation ("plurinominal") deputies elected from the second region.

The current member for the district, elected in the 2024 general election, is Ana Luisa del Muro García of the Labour Party (PT).

== District territory ==
Evolution of electoral district numbers
	1974	1978	1996	2005	2017	2023
Zacatecas	4	5	5	4	4	4
Chamber of Deputies	196	300				

Under the 2023 districting plan adopted by the National Electoral Institute (INE), which is to be used for the 2024, 2027 and 2030 federal elections, the 4th district of Zacatecas covers 313 electoral precincts (secciones electorales) across eight municipalities in the east of the state:

- General Pánfilo Natera, Guadalupe, Noria de Ángeles, Pinos, Trancoso, Villa García, Villa González Ortega and Villa Hidalgo.

The head town (cabecera distrital), where results from individual polling stations are gathered together and tallied, is the city of Guadalupe. The district reported a population of 396,226 in the 2020 census.

== Deputies returned to Congress ==
(Mexico) National parties
- Current
- PAN
- PRI
- PT
- PVEM
- MC
- Morena
- PAZ
- Somos
- Defunct or local only
- PLM
- PNR
- PRM
- PNM
- PP
- PPS
- PARM
- PFCRN
- CON
- PANAL
- PSD
- PES
- PES
- PRD

Zacatecas's 4th district
Election	Deputy	Party	Term	Legislature
1976	Julián Macías Pérez	Institutional Revolutionary Party	1976–1979	50th Congress
1979	Gonzalo García García	Institutional Revolutionary Party	1979–1982	51st Congress
1982	Jesús Ortiz Herrera	Institutional Revolutionary Party	1982–1985	52nd Congress
1985	Manuel Monreal Zamarripa	Institutional Revolutionary Party	1985–1987	53rd Congress
1988	Carlos Pavón Campos	Institutional Revolutionary Party	1988–1991	54th Congress
1991	Celestino Tobanche Alonso	Institutional Revolutionary Party	1991–1994	55th Congress
1994	Carlos Pérez Rico	Institutional Revolutionary Party	1994–1997	56th Congress
1997	Esaú Hernández Herrera	Institutional Revolutionary Party	1997–1998	57th Congress
2000	José Antonio García Leyva	Institutional Revolutionary Party	2000–2003	58th Congress
2003	Rafael Flores Mendoza	Party of the Democratic Revolution	2003–2006	59th Congress
2006	Francisco Javier Calzada Vázquez	Party of the Democratic Revolution	2006–2009	60th Congress
2009	Samuel Herrera Chávez	Party of the Democratic Revolution	2009–2012	61st Congress
2012	Bárbara Romo Fonseca	Ecologist Green Party of Mexico	2012–2015	62nd Congress
2015	Araceli Guerrero Esquivel	Institutional Revolutionary Party	2015–2018	63rd Congress
2018	Samuel Herrera Chávez	National Regeneration Movement	2018–2021	64th Congress
2021	Carolina Dávila Ramírez	Institutional Revolutionary Party	2021–2024	65th Congress
2024	Ana Luisa del Muro García	Labour Party (Mexico)	2024–2027	66th Congress

== Presidential elections ==
Zacatecas's 4th district
Election	District won by	Party or coalition	%
2018	Andrés Manuel López Obrador	Juntos Haremos Historia	50.9871
2024	Claudia Sheinbaum Pardo	Sigamos Haciendo Historia	52.8048
