= Villa González Ortega =

- Municipality
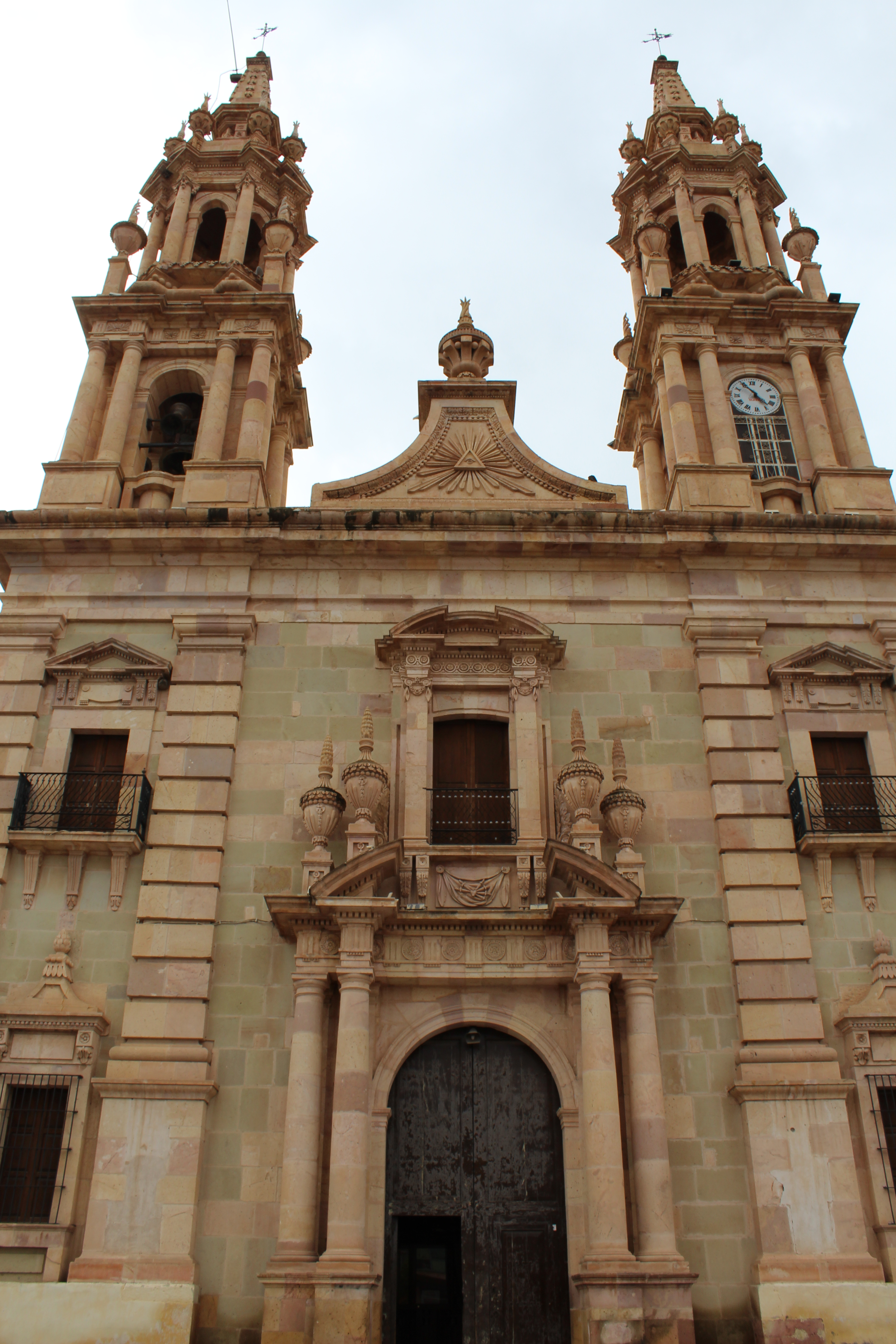
- The UNESCO World Heritage-listed Church of St. Teresa in the municipal seat of Villa González Ortega

- Location of Villa González Ortega Villa González Ortega (Mexico)
- Coordinates: 22°30′49″N 101°55′08″W
- Country: Mexico
- State: Zacatecas
- Established: 19 July 1890
- Seat: Villa González Ortega

Government
  - Municipal president: Ronal García Reyes
  - Federal electoral district: Zacatecas's 4th

Area
  - Total: 431.9 km^{2} (166.8 sq mi)
- Elevation (of seat): 2,144 m (7,034 ft)

Population (2020 Census)
  - Total: 13,208
  - Density: 30.58/km^{2} (79.20/sq mi)
  - Seat: 6,611
- Time zone: UTC-6 (Central)
- Postal code: 98840–98873
- Area code: 496

Villa González Ortega is a municipality in the Mexican state of Zacatecas, located approximately 70 kilometres (43 mi) southeast of the state capital, the city of Zacatecas. It is named after Jesús González Ortega.

== Geography ==
The municipality of Villa González Ortega is located at an elevation between 2,000 and 2,400 metres (6,600–7,900 ft) on the Mexican Plateau in southeastern Zacatecas. It borders the Zacatecan municipalities of Noria de Ángeles to the south, Ojocaliente to the southwest, and General Pánfilo Natera to the northwest. It also borders the municipalities of Villa de Ramos and Salinas in the state of San Luis Potosí to the north and east respectively. The municipality covers an area of 431.9 square kilometres (166.8 sq mi) and comprises 0.6% of the state's area.

As of 2009, 45.7% of the land in Villa González Ortega is used for agriculture. The remainder of the land comprises matorral (51.8%), urban areas (1.3%), and grassland (1.0%). The municipality lies in the endorheic basin of El Salado. Its generally flat terrain is interrupted by small hills and plateaus. There are no permanent rivers in the municipality.

Villa González Ortega has a temperate semi-arid climate with dry winters. Average temperatures in the municipality range between 14 and 18 °C (57–64 °F), and average annual precipitation ranges between 300 and 500 millimetres (12–20 in).

Climate data for Villa González Ortega weather station at 22°31′14″N 101°55′02″W, 2154 m above sea level (1981–2010 averages, 1951–2010 extremes)
| Month | Jan | Feb | Mar | Apr | May | Jun | Jul | Aug | Sep | Oct | Nov | Dec | Year |
|---|---|---|---|---|---|---|---|---|---|---|---|---|---|
| Record high °C (°F) | 38.0 (100.4) | 40.0 (104.0) | 40.0 (104.0) | 44.0 (111.2) | 46.0 (114.8) | 44.0 (111.2) | 42.0 (107.6) | 40.0 (104.0) | 40.0 (104.0) | 40.0 (104.0) | 38.0 (100.4) | 36.0 (96.8) | 46.0 (114.8) |
| Mean daily maximum °C (°F) | 21.2 (70.2) | 23.2 (73.8) | 25.8 (78.4) | 28.7 (83.7) | 30.4 (86.7) | 29.1 (84.4) | 26.8 (80.2) | 26.6 (79.9) | 25.8 (78.4) | 24.9 (76.8) | 23.6 (74.5) | 22.0 (71.6) | 25.7 (78.3) |
| Daily mean °C (°F) | 11.8 (53.2) | 13.3 (55.9) | 15.4 (59.7) | 18.4 (65.1) | 20.5 (68.9) | 20.8 (69.4) | 19.3 (66.7) | 19.0 (66.2) | 18.3 (64.9) | 16.5 (61.7) | 13.8 (56.8) | 12.2 (54.0) | 16.6 (61.9) |
| Mean daily minimum °C (°F) | 2.5 (36.5) | 3.4 (38.1) | 5.0 (41.0) | 8.0 (46.4) | 10.5 (50.9) | 12.5 (54.5) | 11.8 (53.2) | 11.4 (52.5) | 10.9 (51.6) | 8.0 (46.4) | 4.0 (39.2) | 2.4 (36.3) | 7.5 (45.5) |
| Record low °C (°F) | −7.0 (19.4) | −7.0 (19.4) | −6.0 (21.2) | 0.0 (32.0) | 0.0 (32.0) | 5.0 (41.0) | 6.0 (42.8) | 6.0 (42.8) | 1.0 (33.8) | −4.0 (24.8) | −8.0 (17.6) | −10.0 (14.0) | −10.0 (14.0) |
| Average precipitation mm (inches) | 18.7 (0.74) | 10.4 (0.41) | 3.6 (0.14) | 6.0 (0.24) | 23.4 (0.92) | 51.6 (2.03) | 79.9 (3.15) | 53.6 (2.11) | 50.1 (1.97) | 32.1 (1.26) | 6.0 (0.24) | 13.3 (0.52) | 348.7 (13.73) |
| Average rainy days (≥ 1 mm) | 2.3 | 1.4 | 0.7 | 1.4 | 3.9 | 6.4 | 7.9 | 6.2 | 6.2 | 4.1 | 1.1 | 1.4 | 43.0 |
Source: Servicio Meteorológico Nacional

== History ==
Villa González Ortega is situated in an area that was originally inhabited by the Salinero tribe of the Guachichil, one of the Chichimeca nations. The hacienda of El Carro, a cattle ranch, was established in the area in the late 16th century. After Mexican independence, the ranch prospered under the ownership of Juan Nepomuceno de Moncada y Berrio, Count of San Mateo de Valparaíso and Marquess of Jaral de Berrio, whose testament funded the construction of the neoclassical Church of St. Teresa in El Carro between 1850 and 1855. This church, also known as the Temple of Nuestra Señora de los Dolores, was inscribed on the UNESCO list of World Heritage Sites in 2010 as part of the Camino Real de Tierra Adentro.

In 1857, the municipality of Ojocaliente, to which the ranch of El Carro belonged, was transferred from the state of San Luis Potosí to Zacatecas. El Carro was briefly established as a municipality in 1869 before being suppressed in 1870. It regained its municipal status on 19 July 1890, and its prosperity peaked during the Porfiriato. The dismantling of the hacienda after the Mexican Revolution led to a 50% decrease in the population of the municipality.

On 29 November 1922, the municipality was renamed in honour of Jesús González Ortega, commander of the Liberal forces in the Reform War, and governor of Zacatecas from 1858 to 1864. In 1967, a water supply, electrical grid and health clinic were built in the municipal seat.

== Administration ==
The municipal government of Villa González Ortega comprises a president, a councillor (Spanish: síndico), and ten trustees (regidores), six elected by relative majority and four by proportional representation. The municipal presidency is located in the main house of the former hacienda. The current president of the municipality is Ronal García Reyes.

== Demographics ==
In the 2020 Census, Villa González Ortega recorded a population of 13,208 inhabitants living in 3492 households. The 2010 Census recorded a population of 12,893 inhabitants in Villa González Ortega.

There are 31 inhabited localities in the municipality, of which two are classified as urban:

- the municipal seat, also called Villa González Ortega, which recorded a population of 6611 inhabitants in the 2020 Census; and
- Estancia de Animas, located 9 kilometres (5.6 mi) west of the municipal seat, which recorded a population of 2598 inhabitants in the 2020 Census.

== Economy and infrastructure ==
The main economic activities in Villa González Ortega are agriculture and livestock farming. The main crops grown are corn, beans, grapes, and alfalfa.

Federal Highway 49 runs through the northern part of the municipality, connecting it to Zacatecas City in the west and San Luis Potosí City in the southeast.
