= Watersheds of North America =

Drainage basins in North America

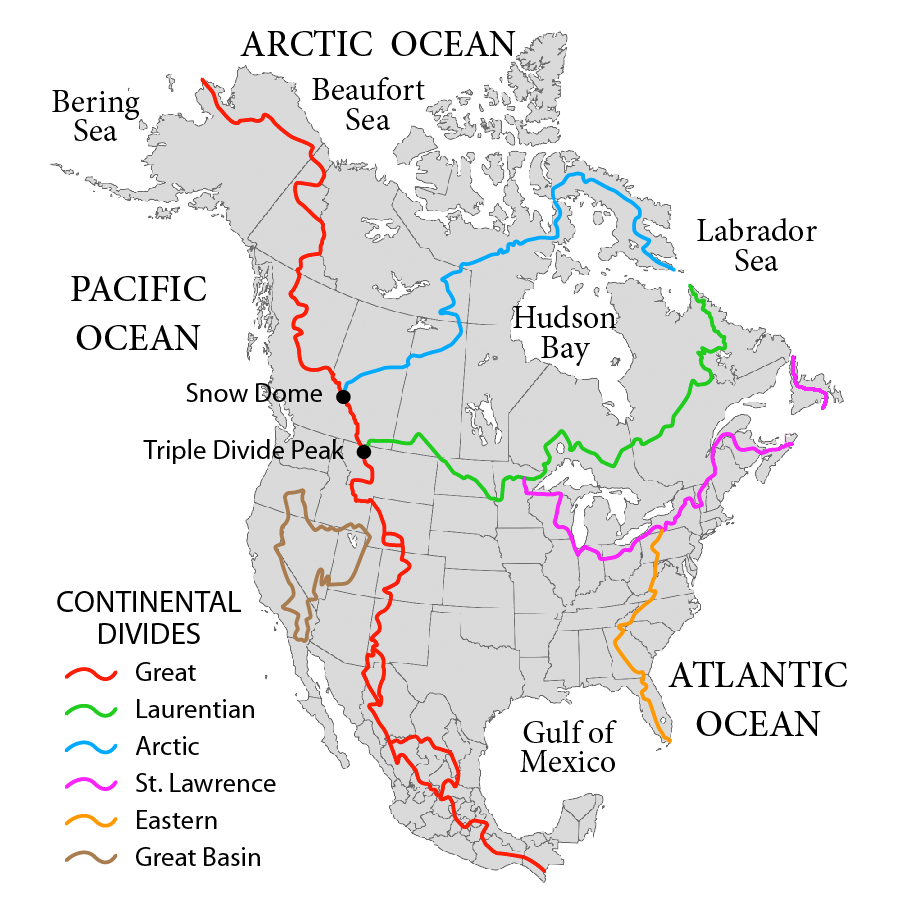
A map of watersheds separated by the principal hydrological divides of North America

Watersheds of North America are large drainage basins which drain to separate oceans, seas, gulfs, or endorheic basins. There are six generally recognized hydro-logical continental divides which divide the continent into seven principal drainage basins spanning three oceans (Arctic, Atlantic and Pacific) and one endorheic basin. The basins are the Atlantic Seaboard basin, the Gulf of Mexico basin, the Great Lakes-St. Lawrence basin, the Pacific basin, the Arctic basin, the Hudson Bay basin, and the Great Basin. Together, the principal basins span the continent with the exception of numerous smaller endorheic basins.

The Atlantic Seaboard basin in eastern North America drains to the Atlantic Ocean; the Great Lakes-St. Lawrence basin in central and eastern North America drains to the Gulf of St. Lawrence on the Atlantic Ocean or to the Labrador Sea; the Gulf of Mexico basin in the southern United States drains to the Gulf of Mexico, a basin of the Atlantic Ocean; the Pacific basin in western North America drains to the Pacific Ocean or the Gulf of California on the Pacific Ocean; the Arctic basin in northwestern North America drains to the Beaufort Sea of the Arctic Ocean or directly to the Arctic Ocean; the Hudson Bay basin in central northern North America drains to Hudson Bay on the Labrador Sea (which may be considered part of either the Arctic Ocean or Atlantic Ocean), or to the Arctic Sea via Foxe Basin and Fury and Hecla Strait; the Great Basin in western United States is an endorheic basin which does not drain to any ocean.

The Atlantic Seaboard basin is bounded by the Atlantic Ocean to the east, the Eastern Continental Divide to the west, the Great Lakes-St. Lawrence Divide to the north, and the Lake Okeechobee endorheic basin to the south. The Gulf of Mexico basin is bounded by the Gulf of Mexico to the south, the Eastern Continental Divide to the east, the Great Lakes-St. Lawrence Divide to the northeast, the Laurentian Divide to the North, and the Continental Divide to the west. The Pacific Basin is bounded by the Continental divide to the east and Pacific Ocean to the west; the basin excludes the endorheic Great Basin in the west. The Great Basin has a closed loop boundary encompassing substantially all of Nevada, the western half of Utah and parts of Oregon, California, Idaho, and Wyoming.

== Endorheic basins ==
Most lakes are not actually endorheic, but endorheic basins may not have standing water, or have water only seasonally. The most significant endorheic basins are these:

- Great Basin covering most of Nevada, the western part of Utah, and smaller amounts of other U.S. states
- Great Divide Basin on the Continental Divide in Wyoming
- Guzmán Basin
- Badwater Basin, Death Valley, California (no standing water)
- Bolsón de Mapimí
- Llanos el Salado

== Boundary landforms ==
The western boundary (Eastern Continental Divide) of the Atlantic Seaboard basin and eastern boundary of the Gulf of Mexico basin is formed by the Appalachian Mountains to the North, the Piedmont Plateau and lowland ridges of the Atlantic Coastal plain to the south. The eastern boundary of the Pacific basin and western boundary of the Gulf of Mexico basin (Continental Divide) is the Rocky Mountains.

== Principal rivers of basins ==
A principal river of a basin is a river that drains directly to the incident ocean, sea or gulf, or into an endorheic basin.

=== Great Lakes-St. Lawrence basin ===
- St. Lawrence River

=== Atlantic Seaboard basin ===
- Susquehanna River
- Hudson River
- Savannah River
- Delaware River
- Potomac River
- Connecticut River

=== Gulf of Mexico basin ===
- Mississippi River
- Brazos River
- Rio Grande
- Grijalva River
- Usumacinta River

=== Arctic basin ===
- Mackenzie River

=== Hudson Bay basin ===
- Churchill River
- Nelson River

=== Pacific basin ===
- Colorado River
- Columbia River
- Fraser River
- Yukon River
- Sacramento River
- Klamath River
- Balsas River
- Lerma River

=== Great Basin ===
- Bear River
- Humboldt River
