= Samuel Herrera Chávez =

Mexican politician

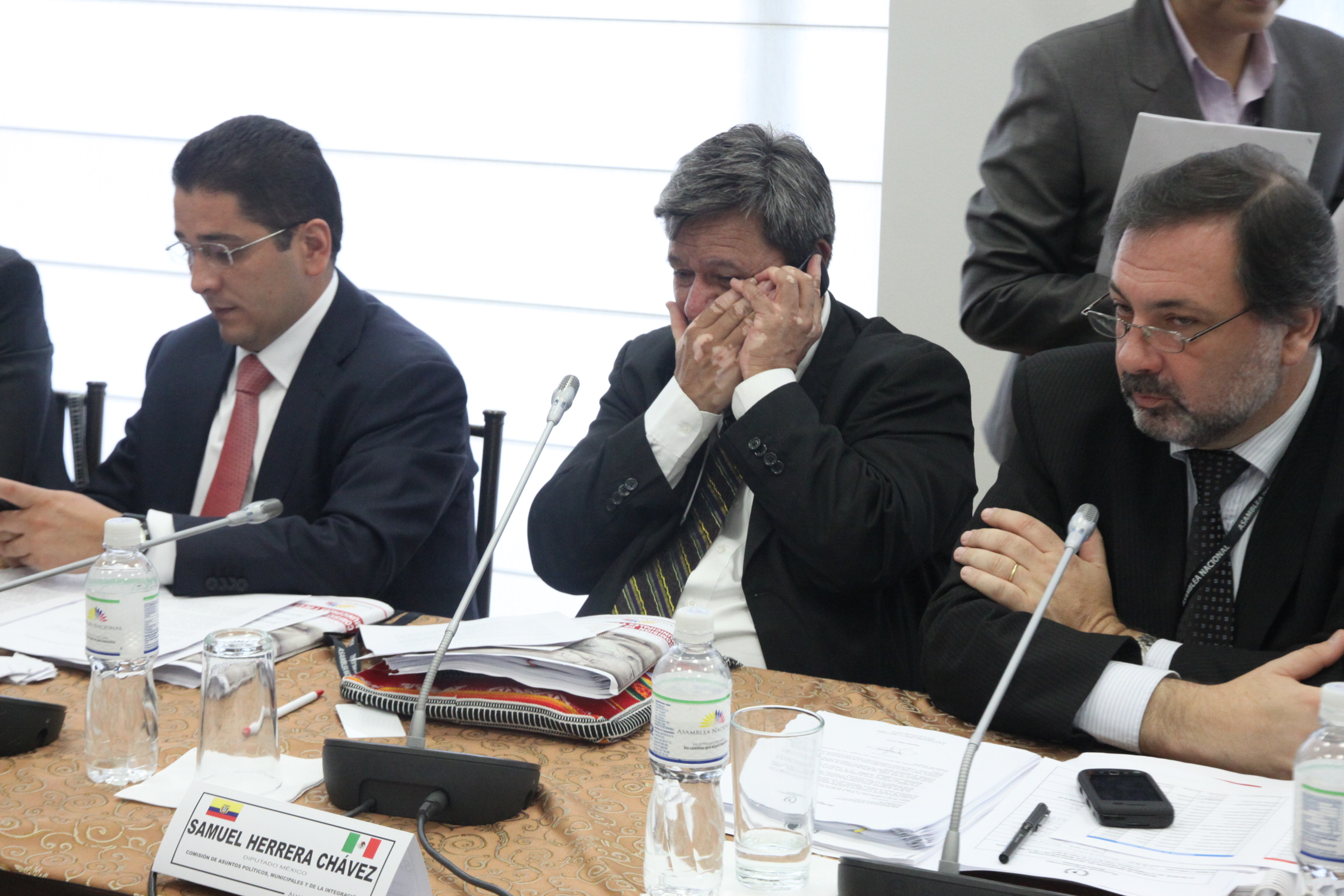

Member of the Chamber of Deputies for Zacatecas's 4th district
- In office 1 September 2018 – 31 August 2021
- Preceded by: Araceli Guerrero Esquivel
- Succeeded by: Carolina Dávila Ramírez
- In office 1 September 2009 – 31 August 2012
- Preceded by: Francisco Javier Calzada
- Succeeded by: Bárbara Romo Fonseca

Personal details
- Born: 17 September 1954 (age 71) Zóquite, Zacatecas, Mexico
- Party: MORENA
- Occupation: Politician

Samuel Herrera Chávez (born 17 September 1954) is a Mexican politician from the Party of the Democratic Revolution (PRD). He has served as a federal deputy representing Zacatecas's fourth district on two occasions: during the 61st Congress from 2009 to 2012, and again from 2018 to 2021 during the 64th Congress. He previously served as a local deputy in the LVII Legislature of the Congress of Zacatecas and as the municipal president of Guadalupe.
