= Rafael Flores =

Rafael Flores may refer to:

- Rafael Flores (footballer), Dominican footballer
- Rafael Flores Jr., American baseball catcher
- Rafael Flores Mendoza, Mexican politician
