= General Pánfilo Natera Municipality =

General Pánfilo Natera
- Municipality
- Location of General Pánfilo Natera General Pánfilo Natera (Mexico)
- Coordinates: 22°39′54″N 102°06′35″W
- Country: Mexico
- State: Zacatecas
- Established: 21 July 1928
- Seat: General Pánfilo Natera

Government
  - President: Freddy González Vázquez

Area
  - Total: 442.1 km^{2} (170.7 sq mi)
- Elevation (of seat): 2,110 m (6,920 ft)

Population (2020 Census)
  - Total: 23,526
  - Density: 53.21/km^{2} (137.8/sq mi)
  - Seat: 4,894
- Time zone: UTC-6 (Central)
- Postal codes: 98730–98760
- Area code: 458

General Pánfilo Natera is a municipality in the Mexican state of Zacatecas, located approximately 50 kilometres (31 mi) east of the state capital. It is named after Pánfilo Natera, commander of the Central Division of the Constitutional Army in the Mexican Revolution, and governor of Zacatecas in 1915 and from 1940 to 1944.

== Geography ==
The municipality of General Pánfilo Natera is located at an elevation between 2,000 and 2,700 metres (6,600–8,900 ft) on the Mexican Plateau in southeastern Zacatecas. It borders the Zacatecan municipalities of Villa González Ortega to the southeast, Ojocaliente to the southwest, Trancoso to the west, and Guadalupe to the northwest. It also borders the municipality of Villa de Ramos in the state of San Luis Potosí to the northeast. The municipality covers an area of 442.1 square kilometres (170.7 sq mi) and comprises 0.6% of the state's area.

As of 2009, 47.2% of the land in Pánfilo Natera is used for agriculture. The remainder of the land comprises matorral (35.3%), grassland (7.6%), mesquite shrubland (4.5%), and urban areas (1.3%). The municipality lies in the endorheic basin of El Salado. Apart from a small mountainous area in the north of the municipality, its terrain is generally flat. There are no permanent rivers in the municipality.

Pánfilo Natera has a temperate semi-arid climate with dry winters. Average temperatures in the municipality range between 14 and 18 °C (57–64 °F), and average annual precipitation ranges between 400 and 500 millimetres (16–20 in).

== History ==
The municipality of General Pánfilo Natera is situated in an area that was originally inhabited by the Guachichil, one of the Chichimeca nations. The first Spanish settlement in the area was established in 1763. After Mexican independence, the area was first part of the state of San Luis Potosí, but was annexed to the municipality of Ojocaliente in Zacatecas in 1857.

On 21 July 1928, the municipality of La Blanca was established, separating it from Ojocaliente. The municipality was renamed in honour of General Pánfilo Natera on 11 November 1964.

== Administration ==
The municipal government of General Pánfilo Natera comprises a president, a councillor (Spanish: síndico), and thirteen trustees (regidores), eight elected by relative majority and five by proportional representation. The current president of the municipality is Freddy González Vázquez.

== Demographics ==
In the 2020 INEGI census, the municipality of General Pánfilo Natera recorded a population of 23,526 inhabitants living in 6040 households. The 2010 Census recorded a population of 22,346 inhabitants in Pánfilo Natera.

INEGI lists 44 localities in the municipality, of which three are classified as urban:

- the municipal seat, also called General Pánfilo Natera, which recorded a population of 4894 inhabitants in the 2020 Census;
- El Saucito, located 8 kilometres (5.0 mi) north of the municipal seat, which recorded a population of 3370 inhabitants in the 2020 Census; and
- San José el Saladillo, located 7 kilometres (4.3 mi) east of the municipal seat, which recorded a population of 2959 inhabitants in the 2020 Census.

== Economy and infrastructure ==
General Pánfilo Natera is primarily an agricultural municipality. The main crops grown are corn, beans and chiles.

Federal Highway 49 runs through the municipality, connecting it to the cities of Zacatecas in the west and San Luis Potosí in the southeast.
