= Noria de Ángeles =

- Municipality
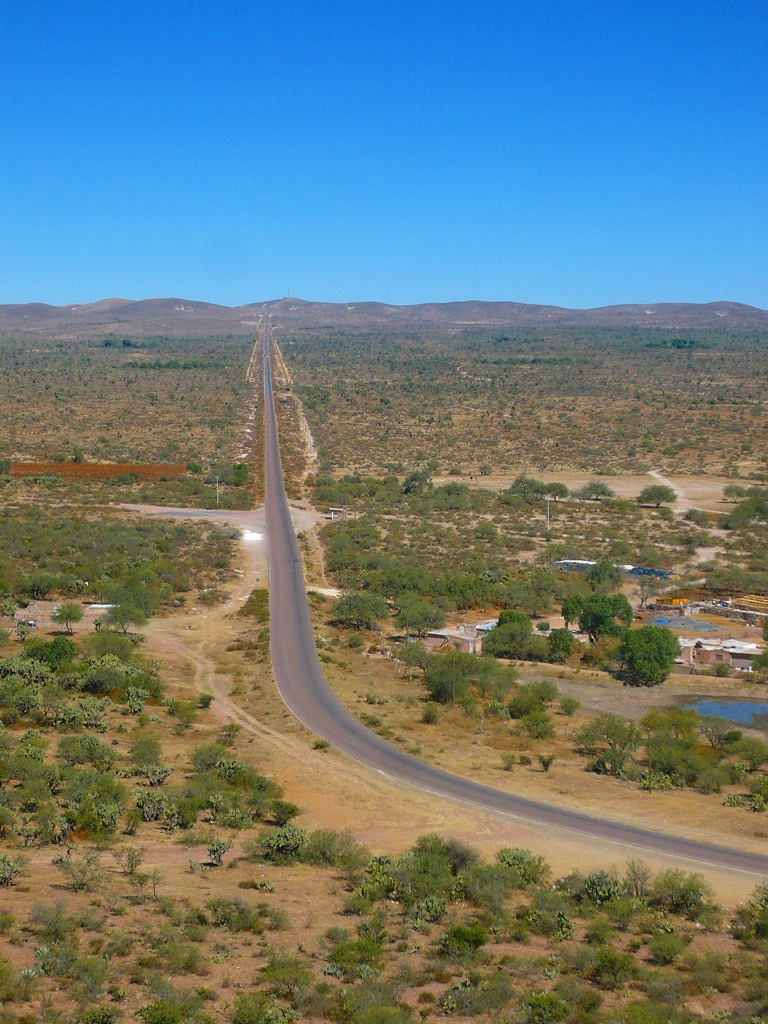
- The road between Loreto and Real de Ángeles, viewed at Estación Genaro looking northeast

- Location of Noria de Ángeles Noria de Ángeles (Mexico)
- Coordinates: 22°26′36″N 101°54′35″W
- Country: Mexico
- State: Zacatecas
- Established: 29 October 1833
- Seat: Noria de Ángeles

Government
  - Municipal president: Manuel Becerra de la Rosa

Area
  - Total: 408.5 km^{2} (157.7 sq mi)
- Elevation (of seat): 2,195 m (7,201 ft)

Population (2020 Census)
  - Total: 16,284
  - Density: 39.86/km^{2} (103.2/sq mi)
  - Seat: 1,633
- Time zone: UTC-6 (Central)
- Postal codes: 98880–98893
- Area code: 496
- Website: Official website

Noria de Ángeles is a municipality in the Mexican state of Zacatecas, located approximately 75 kilometres (47 mi) southeast of the state capital of Zacatecas City.

== Geography ==
The municipality of Noria de Ángeles is located at an elevation between 2,000 and 2,500 metres (6,600–8,200 ft) on the Mexican Plateau in southeastern Zacatecas. It borders the Zacatecan municipalities of Villa Hidalgo to the east, Pinos to the southeast, Loreto to the south, Luis Moya to the west, Ojocaliente to the northwest, and Villa González Ortega to the north. It also borders the municipality of Salinas in the state of San Luis Potosí to the northeast. The municipality covers an area of 408.5 square kilometres (157.7 sq mi) and comprises 0.5% of the state's area.

As of 2009, 60.8% of the land in Noria de Ángeles is used for agriculture. Matorral (33.1%) and grassland (3.5%) cover much of the remainder, while the abandoned Real de Ángeles mine and its tailings area cover 1.9% of the municipality's land area. Most of the municipality lies in the endorheic basin of El Salado, while a portion of the south is drained by the Chicalote River, a tributary of the San Pedro or Aguascalientes River, itself a branch of the Río Verde.

Noria de Ángeles has a temperate semi-arid climate with dry winters. Average temperatures in the municipality range between 16 and 18 °C (61–64 °F), and average annual precipitation ranges between 300 and 500 millimetres (12–20 in).

Climate data for Guadalupe Victoria weather station at 22°23′45″N 101°49′53″W, 2132 m above sea level (1981–2010 averages, 1951–2010 extremes)
| Month | Jan | Feb | Mar | Apr | May | Jun | Jul | Aug | Sep | Oct | Nov | Dec | Year |
|---|---|---|---|---|---|---|---|---|---|---|---|---|---|
| Record high °C (°F) | 32.5 (90.5) | 33.0 (91.4) | 36.0 (96.8) | 37.0 (98.6) | 38.0 (100.4) | 38.0 (100.4) | 35.5 (95.9) | 35.0 (95.0) | 33.0 (91.4) | 33.0 (91.4) | 32.0 (89.6) | 29.5 (85.1) | 38.0 (100.4) |
| Mean daily maximum °C (°F) | 21.4 (70.5) | 23.4 (74.1) | 26.0 (78.8) | 28.7 (83.7) | 30.0 (86.0) | 28.5 (83.3) | 26.2 (79.2) | 26.5 (79.7) | 25.3 (77.5) | 25.0 (77.0) | 24.2 (75.6) | 22.1 (71.8) | 25.6 (78.1) |
| Daily mean °C (°F) | 12.1 (53.8) | 13.6 (56.5) | 15.7 (60.3) | 18.2 (64.8) | 20.2 (68.4) | 20.1 (68.2) | 18.7 (65.7) | 18.8 (65.8) | 18.0 (64.4) | 16.6 (61.9) | 14.7 (58.5) | 12.8 (55.0) | 16.6 (61.9) |
| Mean daily minimum °C (°F) | 2.8 (37.0) | 3.8 (38.8) | 5.3 (41.5) | 7.8 (46.0) | 10.3 (50.5) | 11.7 (53.1) | 11.2 (52.2) | 11.2 (52.2) | 10.7 (51.3) | 8.2 (46.8) | 5.2 (41.4) | 3.5 (38.3) | 7.6 (45.7) |
| Record low °C (°F) | −7.0 (19.4) | −6.0 (21.2) | −3.0 (26.6) | −1.0 (30.2) | 2.0 (35.6) | 4.5 (40.1) | 5.0 (41.0) | 6.0 (42.8) | 3.0 (37.4) | 1.0 (33.8) | −4.5 (23.9) | −7.0 (19.4) | −7.0 (19.4) |
| Average precipitation mm (inches) | 19.2 (0.76) | 10.7 (0.42) | 4.0 (0.16) | 6.9 (0.27) | 30.1 (1.19) | 63.2 (2.49) | 84.2 (3.31) | 64.2 (2.53) | 58.0 (2.28) | 27.3 (1.07) | 8.4 (0.33) | 7.8 (0.31) | 384.0 (15.12) |
| Average rainy days (≥ 1 mm) | 2.3 | 1.3 | 0.6 | 1.4 | 4.2 | 6.4 | 7.3 | 6.3 | 5.8 | 3.3 | 1.0 | 1.5 | 41.4 |
Source: Servicio Meteorológico Nacional

== History ==
Noria de Ángeles is situated in an area that was originally inhabited by the Guachichil, one of the Chichimeca nations. The settlement of Noria de Ángeles was first registered on 15 January 1621, and the mining settlement of Real de Ángeles was recorded in 1705.

The municipality of Angeles was established in the partido of Pinos on 29 October 1833. It became a free municipality under the name of Noria de Ángeles on 19 August 1916. From 1935 to 1941, the municipality was named after Álvaro Obregón.

The Temple of Nuestra Señora de los Ángeles was built in Noria de Ángeles from 24 June 1870 to August 1872. It was inscribed on the UNESCO list of World Heritage Sites in 2010 as part of the Camino Real de Tierra Adentro.

In 1979, the village of Real de Ángeles was demolished and rebuilt 5 kilometres (3.1 mi) to the east to make way for an open-pit silver mine. The world's largest such mine in the 1980s, it was operated from 1982 to 1998 by Grupo Frisco, a mining company owned by Carlos Slim. Grupo Frisco has been repeatedly sanctioned for failing to comply with environmental regulations during the mine's operation and closure. The full extent of the mine's impact on the local environment and the health of the local population has yet to be thoroughly investigated.

== Administration ==
The municipal government of Noria de Ángeles comprises a president, a councillor (Spanish: síndico), and ten trustees (regidores), six elected by relative majority and four by proportional representation. The current president of the municipality is Manuel Becerra de la Rosa.

== Demographics ==
In the 2020 Census, Noria de Ángeles recorded a population of 16,284 inhabitants living in 4126 households. The 2010 Census recorded a population of 15,607 inhabitants in Noria de Ángeles.

There are 36 inhabited localities in the municipality, of which only the municipal seat, also called Noria de Ángeles, is classified as urban. It recorded a population of 1633 inhabitants in the 2020 Census. The most populated locality in the municipality is Maravillas, located 12 kilometres (7.5 mi) southwest of the municipal seat. It recorded a population of 2809 inhabitants in the 2020 Census.

== Economy ==
The main economic activities in Noria de Ángeles are agriculture and cattle farming. The main crops grown are alfalfa and vegetables such as onions, lettuce and tomatillos.
