= Bárbara Romo Fonseca =

Mexican politician (born 1977)

Member of the Chamber of Deputies for Zacatecas's 4th district
- In office 1 September 2012 – 31 August 2015
- Preceded by: Samuel Herrera Chávez
- Succeeded by: Aracelí Guerrero Esquivel

Personal details
- Born: 5 November 1977 (age 48) Zacatecas, Zacatecas, Mexico
- Party: PVEM
- Education: UAZ
- Occupation: Deputy

Bárbara Gabriela Romo Fonseca (born 5 November 1977) is a Mexican politician affiliated with the Ecologist Green Party of Mexico (PVEM). In 2012–2015 she served as a deputy in the 62nd Congress, representing Zacatecas's fourth district.
