= José Antonio García Leyva =

Mexican politician

Member of the Chamber of Deputies for Zacatecas′s 4th district
- In office 1 September 2000 – 31 August 2003
- Preceded by: Esaú Hernández Herrera
- Succeeded by: Rafael Flores Mendoza

Personal details
- Born: 11 January 1960 Pinos, Zacatecas, Mexico
- Died: 28 November 2003 (aged 43)
- Party: PRI
- Occupation: Politician and educator

José Antonio García Leyva (11 January 1960 – 28 November 2003) was a Mexican politician and educator from the Institutional Revolutionary Party. From 2000 to 2003 he served as Deputy of the LVIII Legislature of the Mexican Congress representing Zacatecas.
