= Rafael Flores Mendoza =

Mexican politician (born 1968)

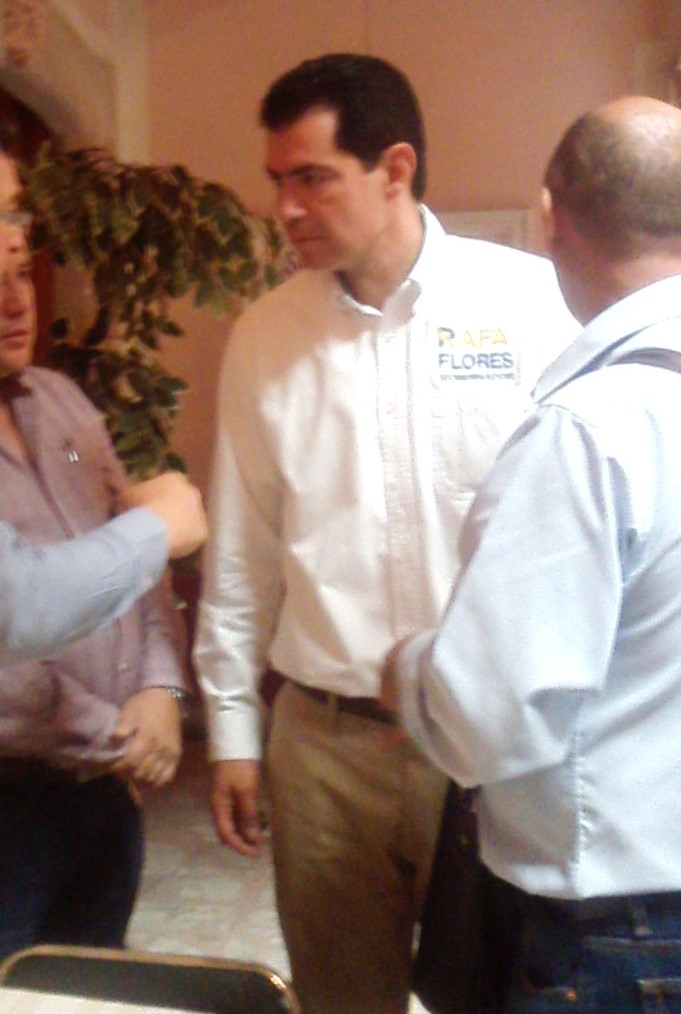

Member of the Chamber of Deputies for Zacatecas′s 4th district
- In office 1 September 2003 – 31 August 2006
- Preceded by: José Antonio García Leyva
- Succeeded by: Francisco Javier Calzada

Personal details
- Born: 5 October 1968 (age 57) Guadalupe, Zacatecas, Mexico
- Party: PRD
- Education: Universidad Regiomontana; UNAM; University of Salamanca
- Occupation: Politician

Rafael Flores Mendoza (born 5 October 1968) is a Mexican politician affiliated with the Party of the Democratic Revolution. As of 2014 he served as Deputy of the LIX Legislature of the Mexican Congress representing Zacatecas and president of Guadalupe, Zacatecas.
