= Villa Hidalgo, Zacatecas =

Settlement in the Mexican state of Zacatecas

Villa Hidalgo
- Town and municipality
- Parroquia del Señor de la Misericordia, Villa Hidalgo

- Location within Zacatecas Location within Mexico
- Coordinates: 22°21′14″N 101°42′47″W
- Country: Mexico
- State: Zacatecas
- Established: 1880

Government
  - Federal electoral district: Zacatecas's 4th

Area
  - Total: 376 km^{2} (145 sq mi)
- Time zone: UTC−6 (Central)

Villa Hidalgo is a town and its surrounding municipality in the Mexican state of Zacatecas. Prior to 1934, the settlement was known as Santa Rita.

In the 2020 INEGI census, the municipality reported a total population of 19,446.
