= Francisco Javier Calzada Vázquez =

Mexican politician

Member of the Chamber of Deputies for Zacatecas′s 4th district
- In office 1 September 2006 – 31 August 2009
- Preceded by: Rafael Flores Mendoza
- Succeeded by: Samuel Herrera Chávez

Personal details
- Born: 4 October 1967 (age 58) Zacatecas, Mexico
- Party: PRD
- Occupation: Politician

Francisco Javier Calzada Vázquez (born 4 October 1967) is a Mexican politician from the Party of the Democratic Revolution. From 2006 to 2009 he served as Deputy of the LX Legislature of the Mexican Congress representing Zacatecas.
