= Guadalupe, Zacatecas =

Town in the Mexican state of Zacatecas

Guadalupe
- City
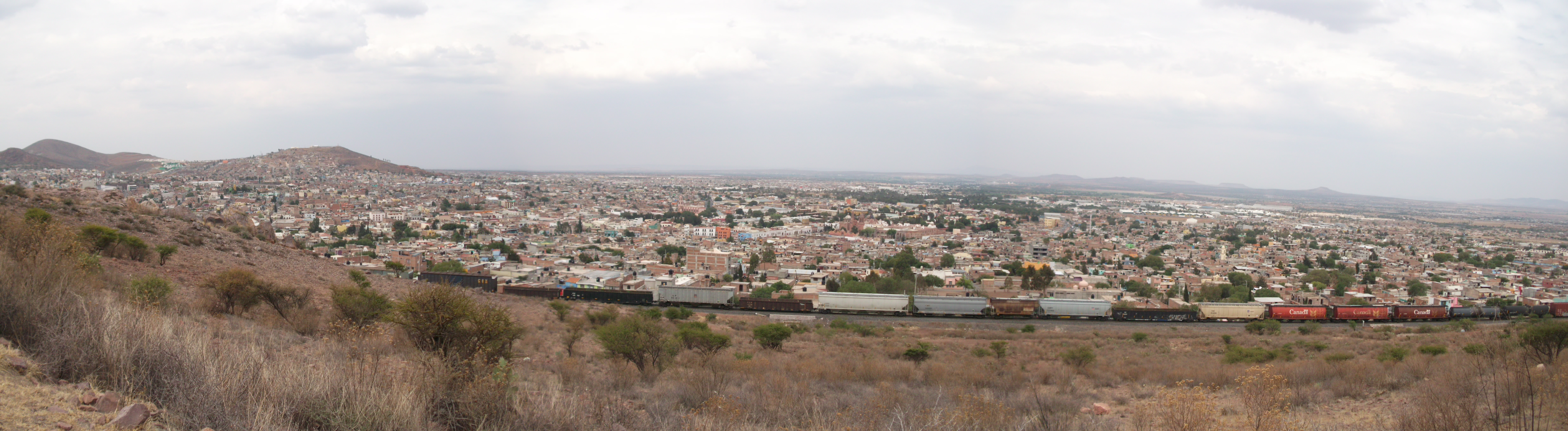
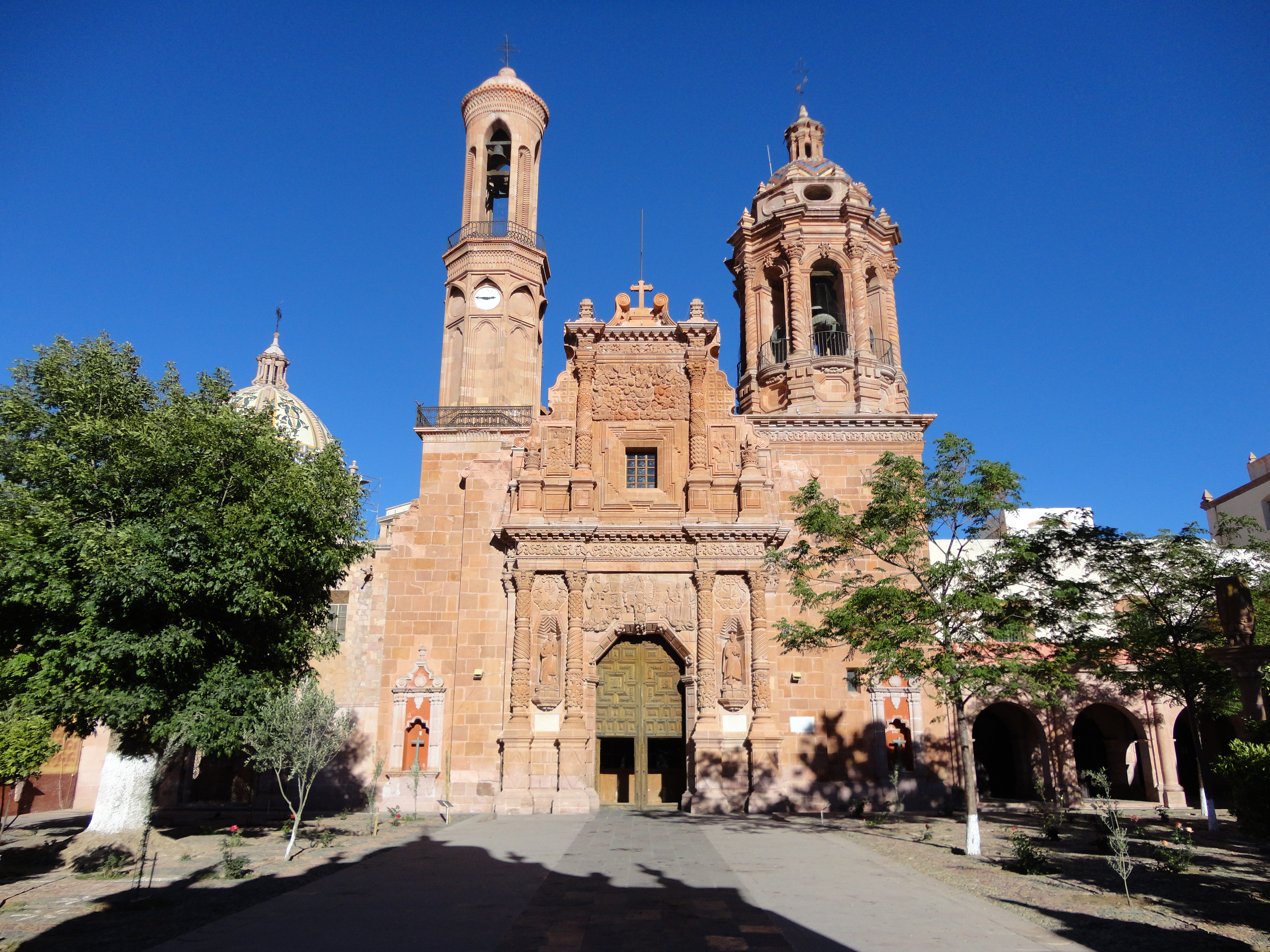
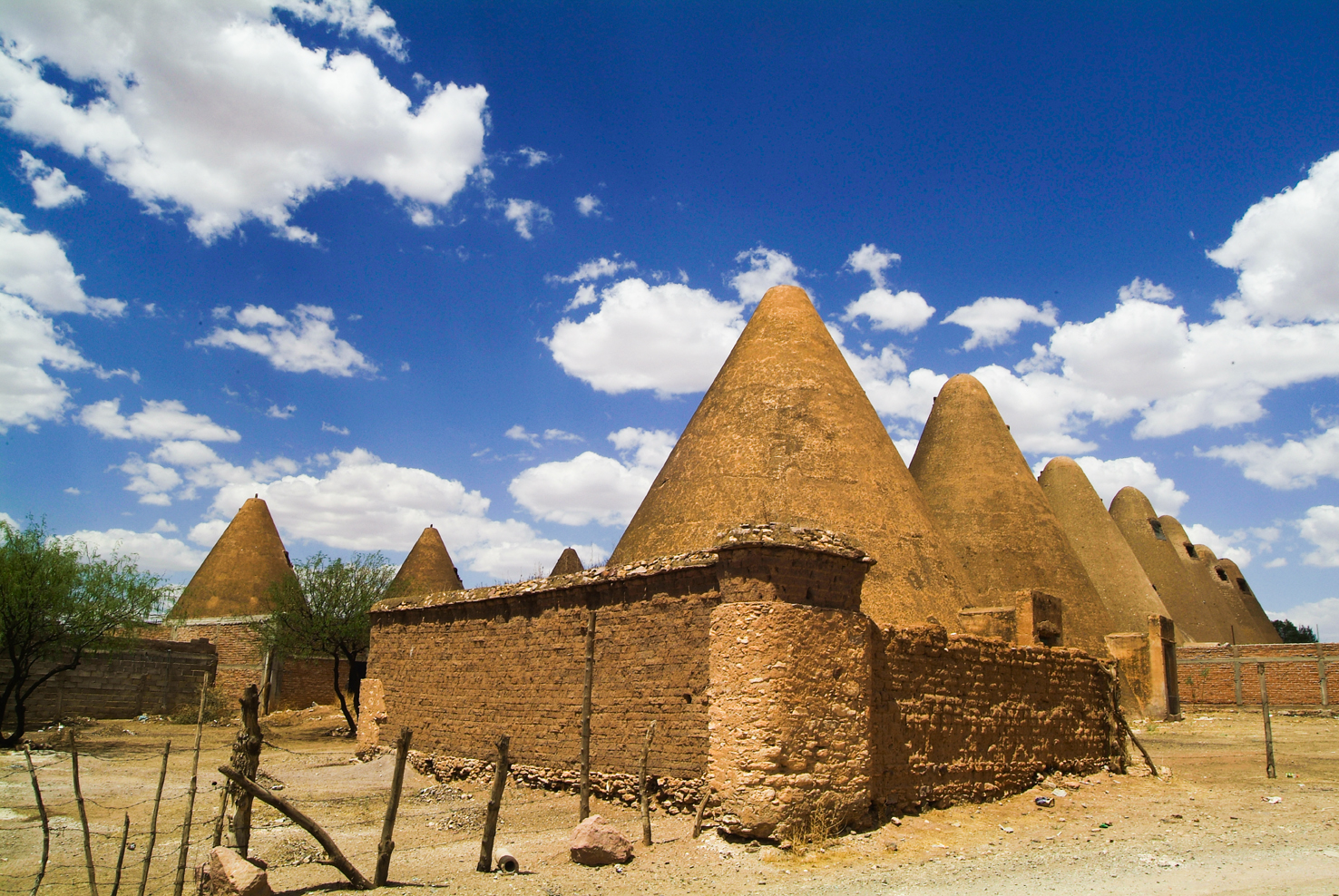
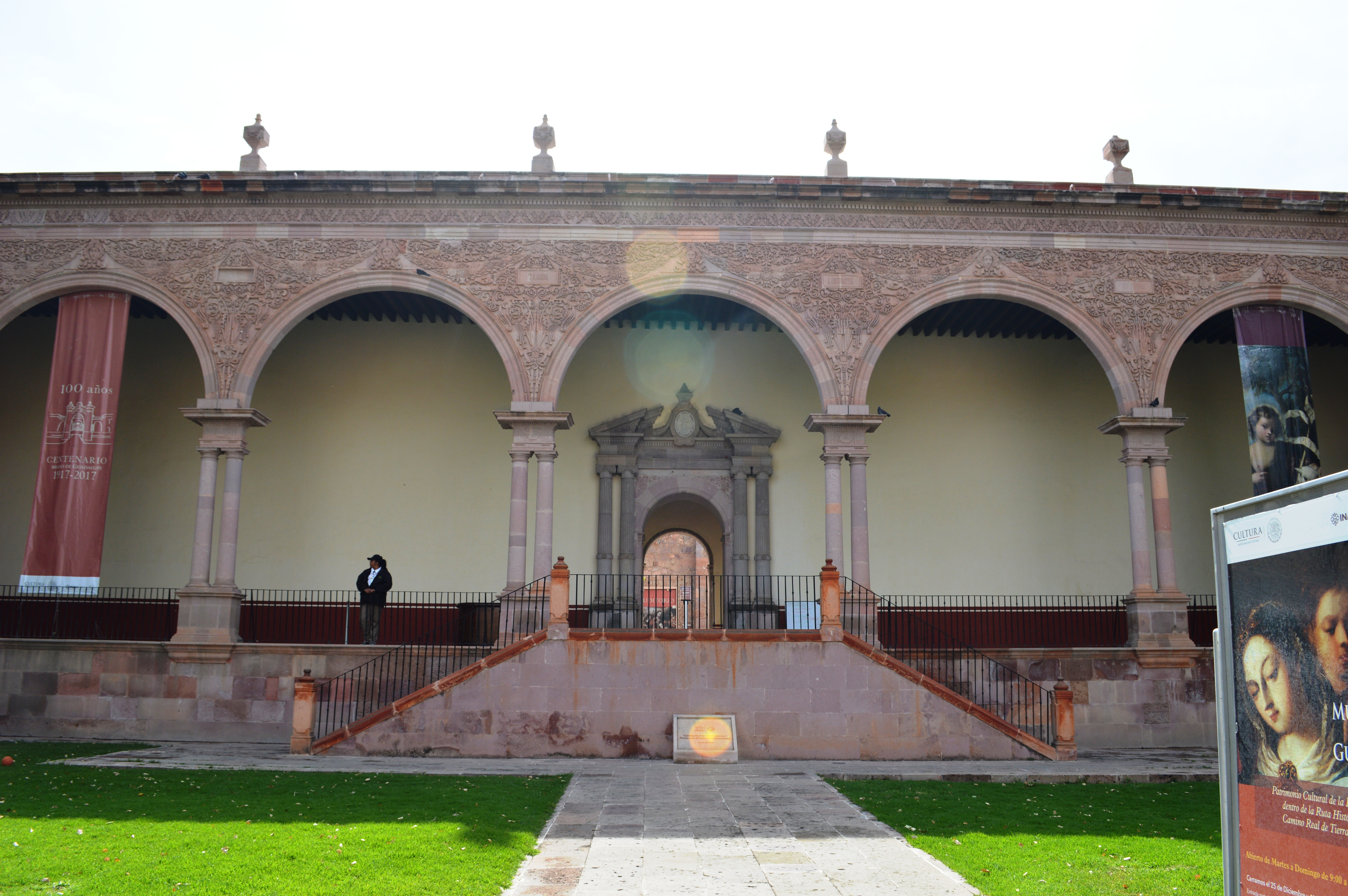
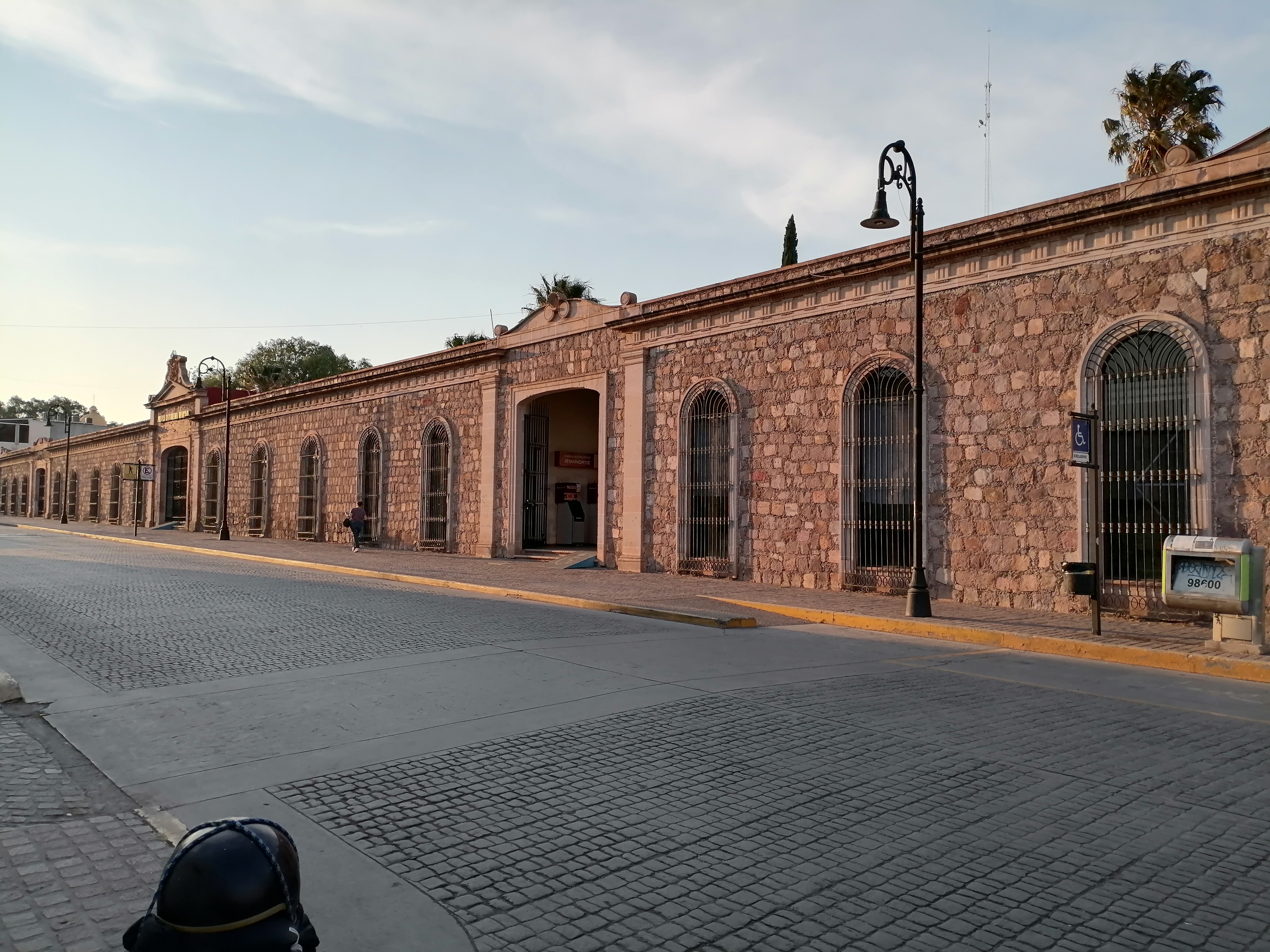
- Top: Panoramic view of Guadalupe; middle: Convent of Our Lady of Guadalupe (left) and Cones of Santa Monica (right); Museum of Guadalupe (left) and Seat of Municipal Government (right).

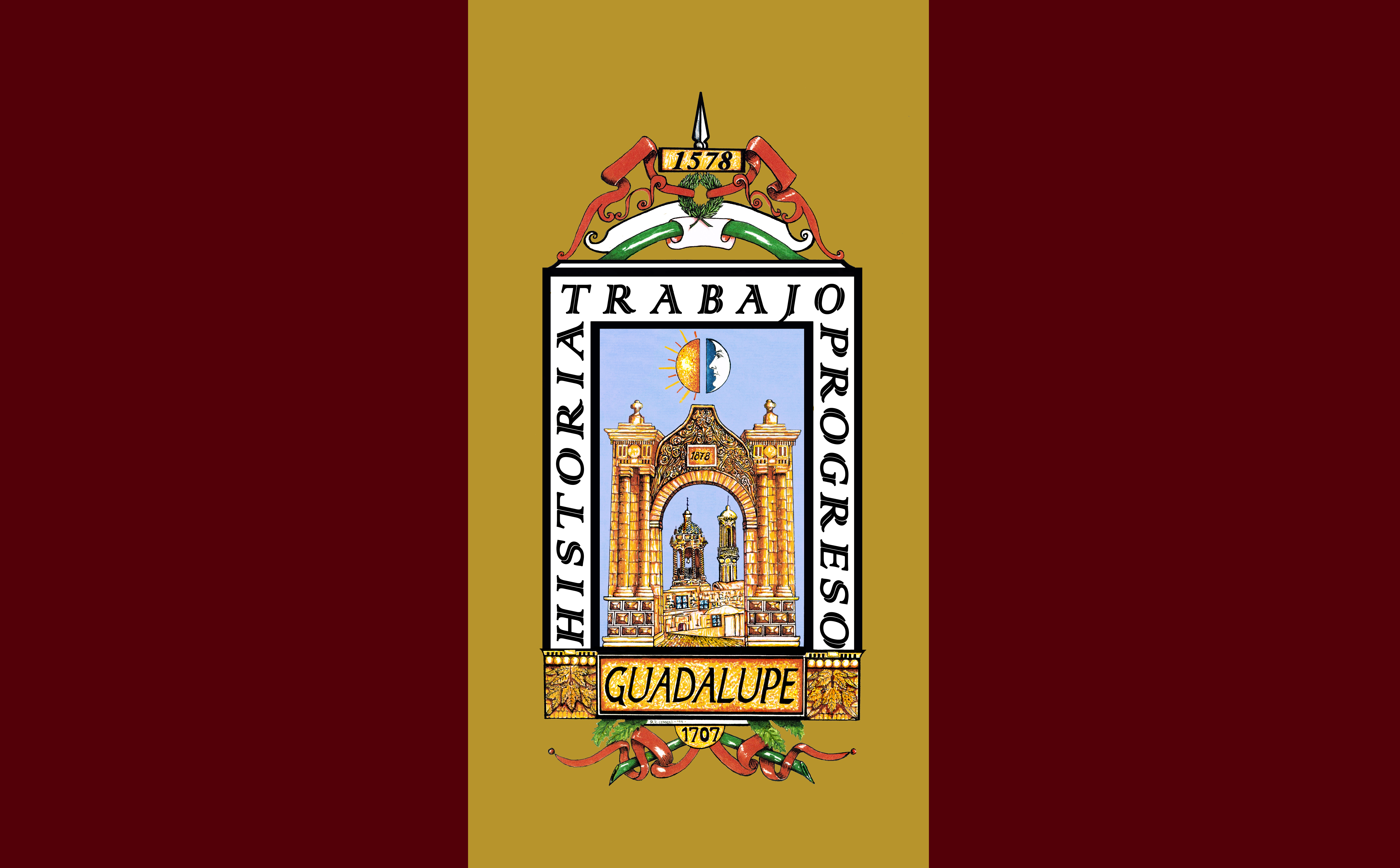
- Flag Seal
- Motto(s): Historia, Trabajo, Progreso (History, Labor, Progress)
- Location in Mexico Guadalupe (Mexico)
- Coordinates: 22°45′10″N 102°30′28″W
- Country: Mexico
- State: Zacatecas
- Municipality: Guadalupe
- Established: 1555

Government
  - Municipal President: José Saldívar Alcalde
- Elevation: 2,334 m (7,657 ft)

Population (2020)
  - Total: 170,029
  - Urban density: 10,428/km^{2} (27,009/sq mi)
- Time zone: UTC–06:00 (Zona Centro)
- Postal code: 98600
- Area code: 492
- Climate: BSk
- Website: https://gobiernodeguadalupe.gob.mx/

UNESCO World Heritage Site
- Official name: Camino Real de Tierra Adentro
- Criteria: Cultural: ii, iv
- Reference: 1351-030
- Inscription: 2010 (34th Session)

Guadalupe is a town in the state of Zacatecas, Mexico. It is located in the central region of the state and is the head of the Municipality of Guadalupe. With a population of 170,029 inhabitants, it is the most populated city in the state and with the city of Zacatecas and surrounding towns it forms a metropolitan area. On August 1, 2010, the Camino Real de Tierra Adentro was inscribed by UNESCO on the World Heritage List, being the former Apostolic College of Propaganda Fide of Our Lady of Guadalupe, one of the sites on the cultural itinerary that reached this title, for its architectural richness and contribution to the evangelization of the north of New Spain. On June 30, 2015, the Legislative Branch of the State of Zacatecas approved that the city of Guadalupe Zacatecas be declared a Historical City, a title that came into effect on Thursday, September 3 of that same year after its promulgation in decree number 400 published in the Official Newspaper of the State of Zacatecas. On October 11, 2018 at the Fifth National Fair of Pueblos Mágicos held in the city of Morelia, Michoacán, Guadalupe received incorporation into the Pueblos Mágicos program, being the sixth to have this registration in the state of Zacatecas.

== History ==
=== Prehispanic ===
Until before the arrival of the Spanish (1546), the city's territories were hunting grounds as well as fruit gathering by small semi-nomadic groups such as the Zacatecos and the Guachichiles.

=== Viceroyalty of New Spain ===
The territory currently occupied by the city of Guadalupe began to be populated after the discovery of the Zacatecas Mines in 1546, with the establishment of haciendas, ranches and orchards that supplied livestock and provisions to the Very Noble and Loyal City of Our Lady of the Zacatecas. Since there is no formal act of founding a town, the year of founding is taken as a reference to the most remote antecedent of land ownership. According to the latest research, it is the year 1555, when Pedro de Ahumada Sámano obtained a land grant for small livestock three quarters of a league from the mines of Zacatecas, on the way to Mexico City, a place that would be known as San Nicolás de los Campos, located where the Arboledas, Campo Bravo and El Carmen neighborhoods are currently located. However, there are versions that date the origin to the granting by the Royal Court of Guadalajara of a land grant to Gonzalo de Cabañas in 1575 of the territory occupied by the Bernárdez hacienda; as well as the issuance of a grant in July 1578 to the Spaniard Diego Chávez de Montoro, from the site where the historic center of the city of Guadalupe is located.

Jerónima de Castilla, widow of Diego de Melgar, gave up a chapel dedicated to Our Lady of Carmel, located outside the city of Zacatecas, which was in ruins, in addition to the land necessary for the construction of a new sanctuary dedicated to Our Lady of Guadalupe, similar to the one built in Mexico City. Ecclesiastical license was granted for this purpose on January 16, 1677.

The Franciscans founded a collection hospice in the same place where the chapel was located, bearing the name of Our Lady of Guadalupe. Later, after obtaining the Royal Decree in January 1704 from Philip V of Spain, on January 12, 1707, the Apostolic College of Propaganda Fide of Our Lady of Guadalupe was founded by the Franciscans Antonio Margil de Jesús, José de Castro, José Guerra, Alonso González, Pedro Franco, José de San Francisco, among others; With the missionary work of this College, Guadalupe acquired great fame and reputation, since it was a Fide Propaganda Center for the promotion of the Christian faith, for a large portion of the northern area of the Viceroyalty of New Spain and a large part of the states from the south of what is now the United States.

=== 19th century ===
During the Independence movement, due to its geographical location, the municipality of Guadalupe was the scene of various relevant events. From January 27 to February 5, 1811, after his defeat in the Battle of Puente de Calderón as he moved towards Northern Mexico, Miguel Hidalgo y Costilla stayed in Guadalupe for 10 days, this fact gave rise to the musical composition "Las Mañanas de Hidalgo", which is considered one of the oldest antecedents of the corrido in Mexico.

At the local level, the figure of José María Rodríguez stands out, who together with the priest Antonio Torres and Víctor Rosales, conspired to surrender the capital to the insurgency. Rodríguez was taken prisoner and sentenced to death, being shot and beheaded on October 3, 1814, placing his head on a stake to serve as a warning to others.

On November 13, 1821, Guadalupe, which until then was part of the territory of the city of Zacatecas, was established as a City Council under the regulations of the Constitution of Cádiz. However, in 1825 it was repealed to the rank of congregational board, not being until 1829 when it was again established as a City Council in accordance with the provisions of the Political Constitution of the State of Zacatecas.

In 1845 the Departmental Assembly of Zacatecas granted Guadalupe the title of Villa de Guadalupe de Rodríguez.

President Benito Juárez, established his itinerant government in Guadalupe on February 16, 1867, before his withdrawal to the state of San Luis Potosí.

=== 20th century ===
On June 23, 1914, during the famous Capture of Zacatecas, the road that connects Guadalupe with the city of Zacatecas was the escape point for the federalist army, and a considerable number of elements were shot down in the attempt.

During the first days of October 1914, Guadalupe was the scene of the meeting between Zapatista and Villista troops, as a preamble to the Convention of Aguascalientes.

With the issuance of the Free Municipality Law promulgated by Venustiano Carranza, the Political Headquarters of the Zacatecas Party made up of the municipalities of Zacatecas, Guadalupe, Chupaderos, Calera and Panúco is abolished, obtaining these demarcations administrative autonomy and without intermediate figures between the town councils and the State Executive. On August 1, 1915, the Civil Administration Board was established in Guadalupe, thereby establishing itself as a free municipality, a status ratified with the Political Constitution of the Free and Sovereign State of Zacatecas of 1918, a category in force to date.
