= Guadalupe Municipality, Zacatecas =

Municipality in the Mexican state of Zacatecas

Guadalupe
- Municipality
- Coat of arms

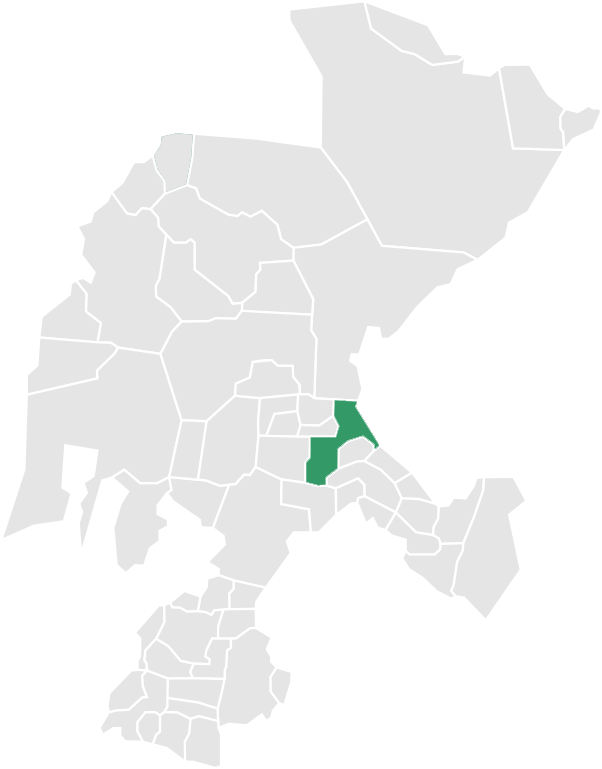
- Municipality of Guadalupe in Zacatecas
- Coordinates: 22°45′10″N 102°30′28″W
- Country: Mexico
- State: Zacatecas
- Municipal seat: Guadalupe

Area
  - Total: 804 km^{2} (310 sq mi)

Population (2020)
  - Total: 211,740

Guadalupe is one of 58 municipalities located in the Mexican state of Zacatecas. Its municipal seat is located in the town of Guadalupe. It has an area of 804 km². The municipality is located in the southeastern part of the state.
