= Llanos el Salado =

Endorheic basin in Mexico

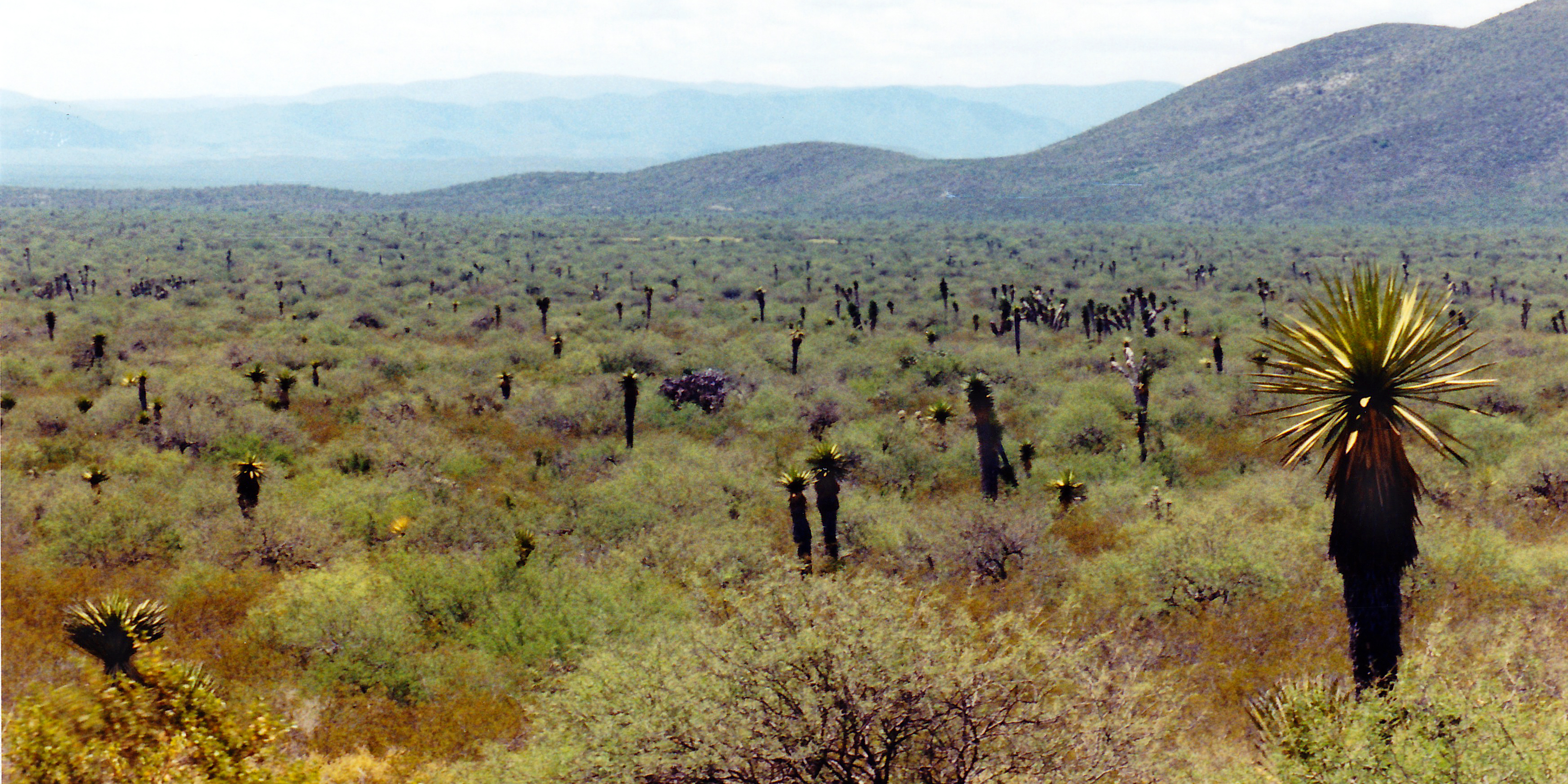
- Chihuahua Desert SW of Tula, Municipality of Tula, Tamaulipas, Mexico (24 September 2003)

Llanos el Salado is a large endorheic basin of central Mexico. It is located on the Mexican Plateau, and covers portions of several Mexican states, including eastern and northeastern Zacatecas, Northern San Luis Potosí, western Tamaulipas, southwestern Nuevo León, and southeastern Coahuila. El Salado blends into the Bolsón de Mapimí, another endorheic basin, on the north. The basin has an arid climate and is covered by deserts and xeric shrublands.

Mexico's National Institute of Statistics and Geography (INEGI) divides the Llanos el Salado region into several basins:

- Fresnillo-Yesca
- Matehuala
- Presa San José-Los Pilares y Otras
- San Pablo y Otras
- Sierra Madre
- Sierra Madre Oriental
- Sierra de Rodriguez

== See also ==
- Meseta Central matorral
