= Riboud =

Riboud (French: [ʁibu]) is a French surname. Notable people surnamed Riboud include:

- Marc Riboud (1923–2016), French photojournalist
- Franck Riboud (born 1955), French businessman
- Barbara Chase-Riboud (born 1939), American artist and poet
- Jean Riboud (1919–1985), French businessman
- Krishna Riboud (1926–2000), Indian art collector
- Philippe Riboud (born 9 April 1957), French fencer
