= Barroso (surname) =

Barroso is a Portuguese and Spanish surname. Notable people with the surname include:

- Abelardo Barroso (1905–1972), Cuban singer
- Adilson Barroso (born 1964), Brazilian politician
- Agustina Barroso (born 1993), Argentine footballer
- Alberto Barroso Campos (born 1996), Spanish tennis player
- Alexandre Barroso (born 1963), Brazilian football manager
- António Barroso (1854–1918), Portuguese missionary and prelate of the Catholic Church
- Antonio Barroso y Castillo (1854–1916), Spanish politician
- Antonio Barroso y Sánchez-Guerra (1893–1982), Spanish general and politician
- Ary Barroso (1903–1964), Brazilian composer
- David Barroso (born 2001), Spanish middle-distance runner
- Eric Barroso (born 1990), Spanish footballer
- Francimar Barroso (born 1980), Brazilian mixed martial artist
- Francisco Barroso Filho (born 1928), Brazilian Roman Catholic bishop
- Francisco Manuel Barroso (1804–1882), 19th century Brazilian commodore
- Graziela Barroso (1912–2003), Brazilian botanist
- Gustavo Barroso (1888–1957), Brazilian writer and politician
- Inezita Barroso (1925–2015), Brazilian folk singer
- Ismael Barroso (born 1983), Venezuelan boxer
- Jaime Barroso (footballer) (born 2007), Spanish footballer
- Jaime Barroso (race walker) (born 1968), Spanish racewalker
- João Soares, full name João Barroso Soares (born 1949), Portuguese lawyer and politician
- João Carlos Barroso (1950–2019), Brazilian actor
- José Barroso (born 1970), Portuguese footballer
- José Barroso Chávez (1925–2008), Mexican Red Cross official.
- José Manuel Barroso (born 1956), former Prime Minister of Portugal and the former President of the European Commission
- Julio Barroso (born 1985), Argentine footballer and manager
- Leonardo Barroso (born 2005), Portuguese footballer
- Luís Barroso (born 1966), Portuguese sprinter
- Luís Oliveira, full name Luís Airton Barroso Oliveira (born 1969), Brazilian-Belgian footballer
- Luís Roberto Barroso (born 1958), Brazilian jurist and judge of the Brazilian supreme court
- Luiz André Barroso (1964 –2023), Brazilian computer engineer
- Manuel Barroso (pentathlete) (born 1964), Portuguese modern pentathlete
- Manuel Barroso (rower), (born 1931), Portuguese rower
- Maria Barroso (1925–2015), Portuguese actress and wife of former Portuguese Prime Minister Mário Soares
- Maria Alice Barroso (1926–2012), Brazilian writer
- Mariano Barroso (born 1959), Spanish film director and screenwriter
- Mário Barroso (born 1947), Portuguese film director, actor and cinematographer
- Miguel Barroso (1538–1590), Spanish painter
- Miguel Barroso Ayats (1953–2024), Spanish journalist and politician
- Pablo Jose Barroso, Mexican film producer
- Philippe Barroso (born 1955), French alpine skier
- Ricardo Barroso Barroso (born 1973), Mexican architect and plastic artist
- Ricardo Barroso Agramont (born 1980), Mexican politician
- Sergio Barroso (born 1946), Cuban composer, performer and professor
- Susana Barroso (born 1974), Portuguese Paralympic swimmer
- Tomás Barroso (born 1990), Portuguese basketball player
