= São Schlumberger =

Portuguese-American art collector

- Born: Maria da Conceição; Schroeder Diniz; 15 October 1929; Porto, Portugal
- Died: 15 August 2007 (aged 77); Paris, France
- Education: University of Lisbon
- Occupations: Fashion and art patron and collector
- Spouses: Pedro Bessone Basto; Pierre Schlumberger (m. 1961; died 1986)
- Children: 2

Maria "São" Schlumberger (née Maria da Conceição Diniz; 15 October 1929 – 15 August 2007), was a Portuguese-born American fashion and art patron and collector, and the second wife of Pierre Schlumberger.

== Biography ==
She was born Maria da Conceição Schroeder Diniz on 15 October 1929 in Porto, Portugal. Her father was a landowner, who grew cork and olives, and her mother – Erna Schröder – was a German heiress from Hamburg. Her parents first met at the University of Coimbra and were never legally married. She was largely, then only, raised by her Portuguese paternal grandmother when her German maternal grandmother had distanced herself after marrying another man. From the age of ten, she attended a Lisbon boarding school run by nuns and, in 1951, earned a degree in philosophy and history from the University of Lisbon.

She studied psychology for three months at New York's Columbia University, and then worked as a counsellor for juvenile delinquents in Lisbon, before switching to studying art at the Museu Nacional de Arte Antiga, where she met Pedro Bessone Basto, a "boulevardier" from a wealthy family. They married in New York, and divorced in under a year.

In 1961, the Lisbon-based Gulbenkian Foundation awarded her a fellowship to research children's programs in New York museums, and once there was helped by Kay Lepercq, whose husband Paul Lepercq was an investment banker, and his clients included the Schlumberger family. After two months, Pierre Schlumberger (1914–1986) proposed and they married in 1961. His first wife, Claire Schwob d'Héricourt, with whom he had five children, died from a stroke in 1959. Pierre and São had two children, Paul-Albert, in 1962, and Victoire, in 1968. They lived in Houston, Texas, until he was ousted as CEO in "a family coup" in 1965, and moved to New York City and then Paris.

In Paris, they lived in an 18th-century hôtel particulier in the Rue Férou, next door to Man Ray, restored by French architect Pierre Barbe, with interior design by Valerian Rybar in "a provocative mix of classic and modern styles". She regularly organised parties, ranging from formal black-tie balls to a "hot-pants party".

Her husband Pierre Schlumberger purchased a 100-acre estate near the upscale Portuguese resort of Estoril, where she hosted her renowned "La Dolce Vita" ball for 1,500 guests in 1968. She had Pierre purchase Le Clos Fiorentina, one of the most exquisite historic villas on the French Riviera, in Saint-Jean-Cap-Ferrat, after their main house burned down following the Portuguese anti-Fascist revolution of 1974. She then recruited David Hicks, the son-in-law of Lord Mountbatten, to restore the property.

She died in Paris on 15 August 2007. Her funeral at Saint-Pierre-du-Gros-Caillou church in the 7th arrondissement was attended by six people, due to the city being "empty" in August: her daughter Victoire, Henri, Count of Paris, Parisian businessman André Dunstetter, Georgian aristocrat Nicholas Dadeshkeliani, the graphic artist Philippe Morillon, and Maria, her personal maid.

== Art patron and collector ==
In 1975, Schlumberger produced French writer François-Marie Banier's play, Hôtel du Lac. She offered to support Banier financially so he could focus on writing, but he declined.

Schlumberger particularly liked the work of Mark Rothko, Robert Rauschenberg, and Roy Lichtenstein. Her portrait was painted by Salvador Dalí, but in 1987, she said, "I don't really like it. I was expecting a fantasy... but he did a classic". Dali also designed for her an elaborate pearl-and-emerald necklace which she often wore. Andy Warhol also painted her portrait.

She was a patron to the fashion designer John Galliano, and lent him her empty 17th-century Paris hotel particulier (which she had left for a new Right Bank apartment), for his autumn 1994 show, designed with the help of André Leon Talley, Amanda Harlech, and Steven Robinson.
