= Cristiada =

Cristiada may refer to:

- Cristiada, an armed uprising in Mexico; see Cristero War
- Cristiada (film), a film about the uprising
