= Saint-Jean-Cap-Ferrat =

Commune in Provence-Alpes-Côte d'Azur, France

Saint-Jean-Cap-Ferrat Sant Joan de Cap Ferrat (Occitan)
- Commune
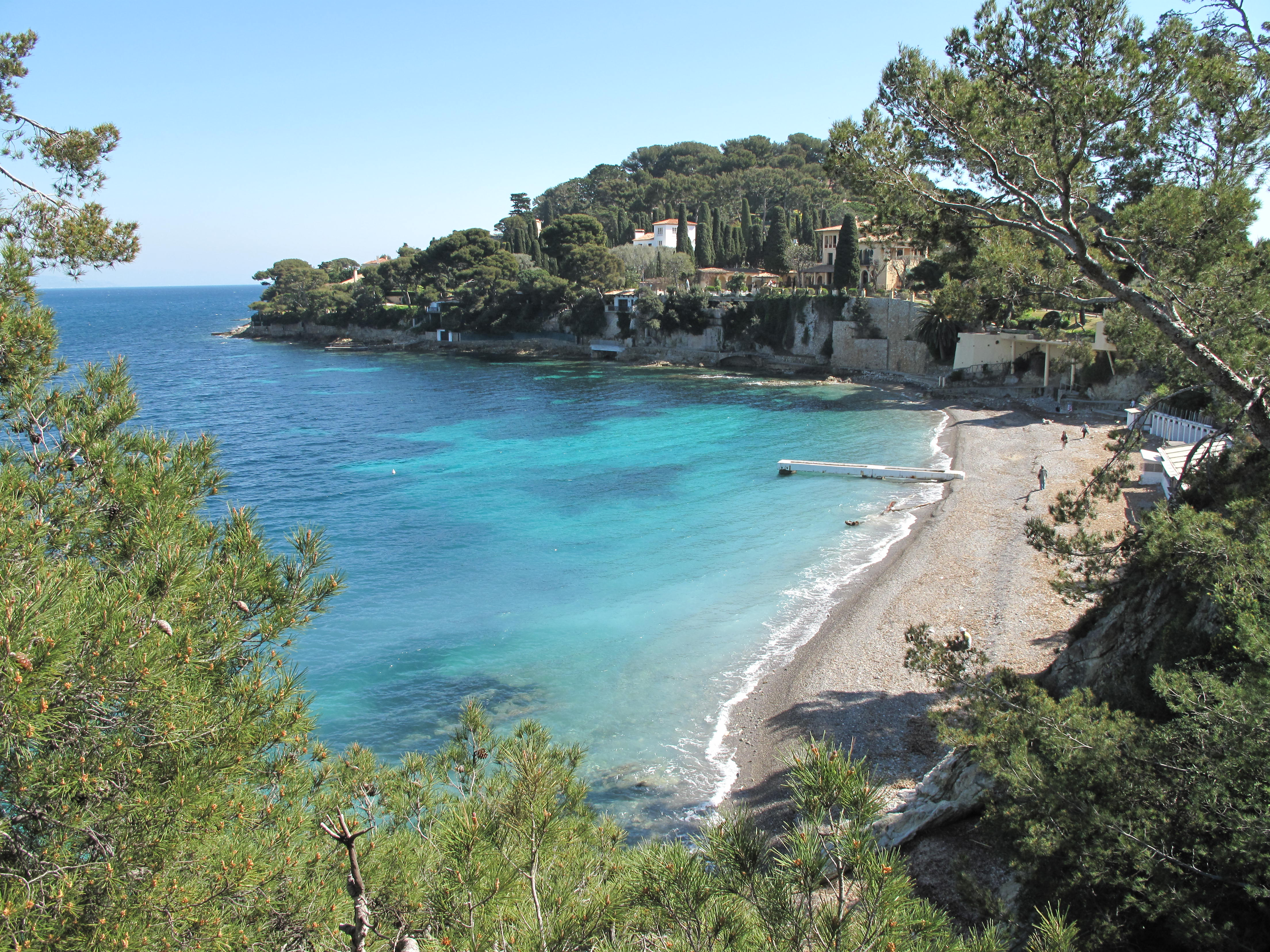
- Pointe Sainte-Hospice in Saint-Jean-Cap-Ferrat

- Coat of arms
- Location of Saint-Jean-Cap-Ferrat
- Location within France Location within Provence-Alpes-Côte d'Azur
- Coordinates: 43°41′00″N 7°20′00″E
- Country: France
- Region: Provence-Alpes-Côte d'Azur
- Department: Alpes-Maritimes
- Arrondissement: Nice
- Canton: Beausoleil
- Intercommunality: Métropole Nice Côte d'Azur

Government
  - Mayor (2026–32): Jean-François Dieterich
- Area^{1}: 2.48 km^{2} (0.96 sq mi)
- Highest elevation: 138 m (453 ft)
- Lowest elevation: 0 m (0 ft)
- Population (2023): 1,531
  - Density: 617/km^{2} (1,600/sq mi)
- Time zone: UTC+01:00 (CET)
  - Summer (DST): UTC+02:00 (CEST)
- INSEE/Postal code: 06121 /06230
- ^{1} French Land Register data, which excludes lakes, ponds, glaciers > 1 km^{2} (0.386 sq mi or 247 acres) and river estuaries.

Saint-Jean-Cap-Ferrat (French pronunciation: [sɛ̃ ʒɑ̃ kap fɛʁa]; Occitan: Sant Joan de Cap Ferrat; Italian: San Giovanni Capo Ferrato) is a resort town and commune in the Alpes-Maritimes department in the Provence-Alpes-Côte d'Azur region in Southeastern France. In 2012, Cap Ferrat was named the second most expensive residential location in the world, after Monaco, earning it the nickname 'Billionaires' Peninsula'.

Saint-Jean-Cap-Ferrat is located on a peninsula next to Beaulieu-sur-Mer and Villefranche-sur-Mer and extends out to Cap Ferrat. Its tranquility and warm climate make it a favourite holiday destination among the European aristocracy and international rich who visit the French Riviera.

== History ==
Saint Jean Cap Ferrat was known to the ancient Greeks as Anao. The site of present-day Cap Ferrat was first settled by Celto-Ligurian tribes, then by the Lombards at the end of the 6th century. Sant Ospizio (or Saint Hospice), a hermit friar, is said to have inhabited a tower on the Eastern part of the peninsula.

=== Middle Ages ===
Saint-Jean-Cap-Ferrat had once been known as Cap-Saint-Sospir after a sixth-century monk who had lived in the area. In the 8th century, the history of Saint Jean Cap Ferrat changed when the Saracens occupied the site and used it as a base for pirating until the 11th century.

By 1388, the territory of Saint Jean Cap Ferrat with the entire County of Nice was given by treaty to the Dukes of Savoy (see also History of Villefranche-sur-Mer).

The history of Saint Jean Cap Ferrat tells that Duke Emmanuel Philibert of Savoy built a fort at Saint-Hospice in 1561 in an effort to secure the coastline from invaders. The fort was destroyed in 1706 by the Duke of Berwick when Nice was occupied by the French armies of King Louis XIV.

=== Renaissance ===
During the 18th century, the history of Saint Jean Cap Ferrat changed when the area - officially part of the Kingdom of Sardinia - was occupied off and on by the French. It was returned to the Kingdom of Sardinia in 1814 after Napoleon's abdication.

In 1860, the County of Nice was finally ceded by treaty to France and the peninsula became a magnet for kings and wealthy visitors, a new era in the history of Saint Jean Cap Ferrat. The small fishing village of Saint Jean developed and by 1904 was established as a self-standing commune with the rest of the peninsula, separated from nearby Villefranche-sur-Mer.

=== Belle Époque era of economic prosperity ===
At the beginning of the 20th century, King Léopold II of Belgium owned an estate on Cap Ferrat and built several houses and an artificial lake. The main residence is the Villa des Cèdres, which has been owned by Marnier-Lapostolle (the founder of Grand Marnier) since 1924 and is now in part a botanical garden called the Jardin botanique Les Cèdres.

In 1905, Béatrice Ephrussi de Rothschild chose Cap Ferrat to build a Tuscan-style palazzo, now known as Villa Ephrussi de Rothschild museum. This location can be rented under special conditions to host galas and events in the park and gardens.

Today Saint-Jean Cap-Ferrat has probably some of the most expensive real estate in the world, and continues to attract the rich. Current residents include theatrical composer Andrew Lloyd Webber.

Some of its Italianate and Belle Époque estates have hosted a plethora of heads of state, aristocrats, and personalities: King Leopold II of Belgium, Baroness de Rothschild, Charlie Chaplin, Rainier III, David Niven, Somerset Maugham, Jean Cocteau, Lady Kenmare and Roderick Cameron, Elizabeth Taylor and Richard Burton, Pierre and São Schlumberger, Hubert de Givenchy, Rachel Lambert Mellon, Mary Wells Lawrence, Isadora Duncan, Winston Churchill, French prime ministers Maurice Rouvier and Raymond Barre. Major Berkeley Levett, an English aristocrat and witness in the infamous Royal Baccarat Scandal, lived there with his brewery heiress wife, the former Sibell Bass.

== Population ==
Historical population
Year	Pop.	±% p.a.
1968	2,356	—
1975	2,268	−0.54%
1982	2,215	−0.34%
1990	2,248	+0.19%
1999	1,895	−1.88%
2007	2,135	+1.50%
2012	1,889	−2.42%
2017	1,573	−3.60%
2023	1,531	−0.45%
Source: INSEE

== Climate ==
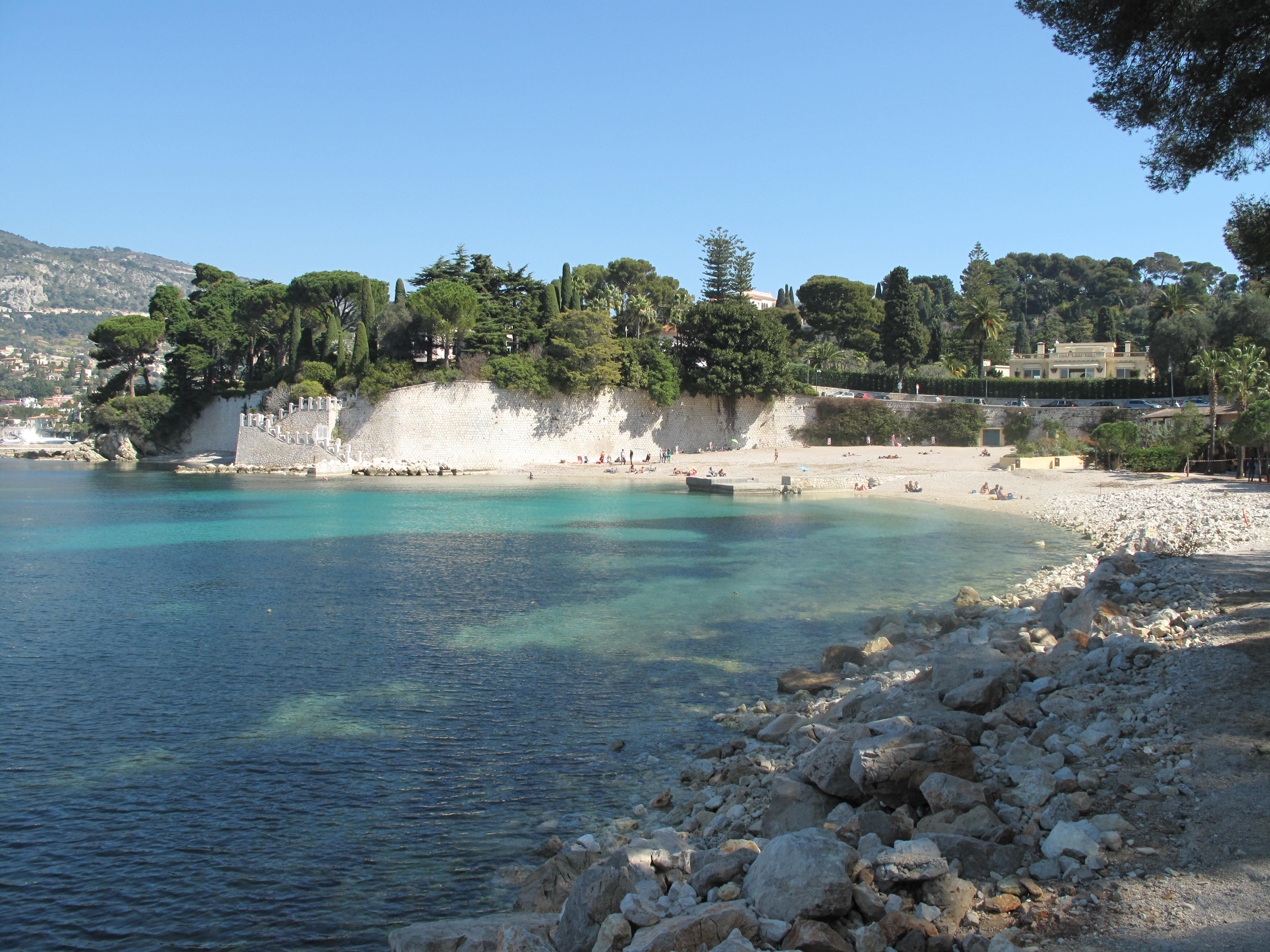
Passable beach

Saint-Jean-Cap-Ferrat has a mild Mediterranean climate. Average temperatures range from 9 °C (48 °F) in January to 23 °C (73 °F) in the summer. There is very little rainfall in the summer. Although occasionally the mistral winds arrive, it is more sheltered by the mountains than for example St. Tropez, so the winds are not as strong.

Climate data for Saint-Jean-Cap-Ferrat (1981–2008 averages, extremes 1921–2008)
Month	Jan	Feb	Mar	Apr	May	Jun	Jul	Aug	Sep	Oct	Nov	Dec	Year
Record high °C (°F)	22.0 (71.6)	23.0 (73.4)	24.0 (75.2)	26.0 (78.8)	32.0 (89.6)	34.8 (94.6)	36.8 (98.2)	35.0 (95.0)	34.0 (93.2)	29.0 (84.2)	24.8 (76.6)	21.1 (70.0)	36.8 (98.2)
Mean daily maximum °C (°F)	12.4 (54.3)	12.5 (54.5)	14.3 (57.7)	16.0 (60.8)	20.1 (68.2)	23.7 (74.7)	26.8 (80.2)	27.3 (81.1)	23.9 (75.0)	20.2 (68.4)	15.9 (60.6)	13.4 (56.1)	18.9 (66.0)
Daily mean °C (°F)	10.1 (50.2)	10.0 (50.0)	11.7 (53.1)	13.4 (56.1)	17.3 (63.1)	20.8 (69.4)	23.8 (74.8)	24.4 (75.9)	21.2 (70.2)	17.7 (63.9)	13.6 (56.5)	11.2 (52.2)	16.3 (61.3)
Mean daily minimum °C (°F)	7.8 (46.0)	7.6 (45.7)	9.1 (48.4)	10.8 (51.4)	14.6 (58.3)	18.0 (64.4)	20.9 (69.6)	21.5 (70.7)	18.5 (65.3)	15.3 (59.5)	11.4 (52.5)	9.0 (48.2)	13.7 (56.7)
Record low °C (°F)	−3.8 (25.2)	−5.0 (23.0)	−4.0 (24.8)	1.8 (35.2)	5.6 (42.1)	9.0 (48.2)	12.0 (53.6)	12.0 (53.6)	7.8 (46.0)	5.2 (41.4)	0.2 (32.4)	−0.6 (30.9)	−5.0 (23.0)
Average precipitation mm (inches)	60.0 (2.36)	43.5 (1.71)	35.1 (1.38)	63.0 (2.48)	44.7 (1.76)	32.8 (1.29)	9.9 (0.39)	23.9 (0.94)	72.2 (2.84)	118.1 (4.65)	87.0 (3.43)	80.0 (3.15)	670.2 (26.39)
Average precipitation days (≥ 1.0 mm)	5.3	4.5	4.4	7.0	5.4	3.7	1.7	2.6	4.7	7.6	6.7	6.0	59.6
Average relative humidity (%)	72	72	73	75	77	78	76	75	76	75	73	71	74.4
Source 1: Météo France
Source 2: Infoclimat.fr (humidity 1961–1990)

=== Winter ===
The temperatures drop below 10 °C (50 °F) for only three months of the year (December to February), and winters on the French Riviera are balmy in comparison to the cold and gloomy weather that predominates the northern European countries.

== Townscape ==
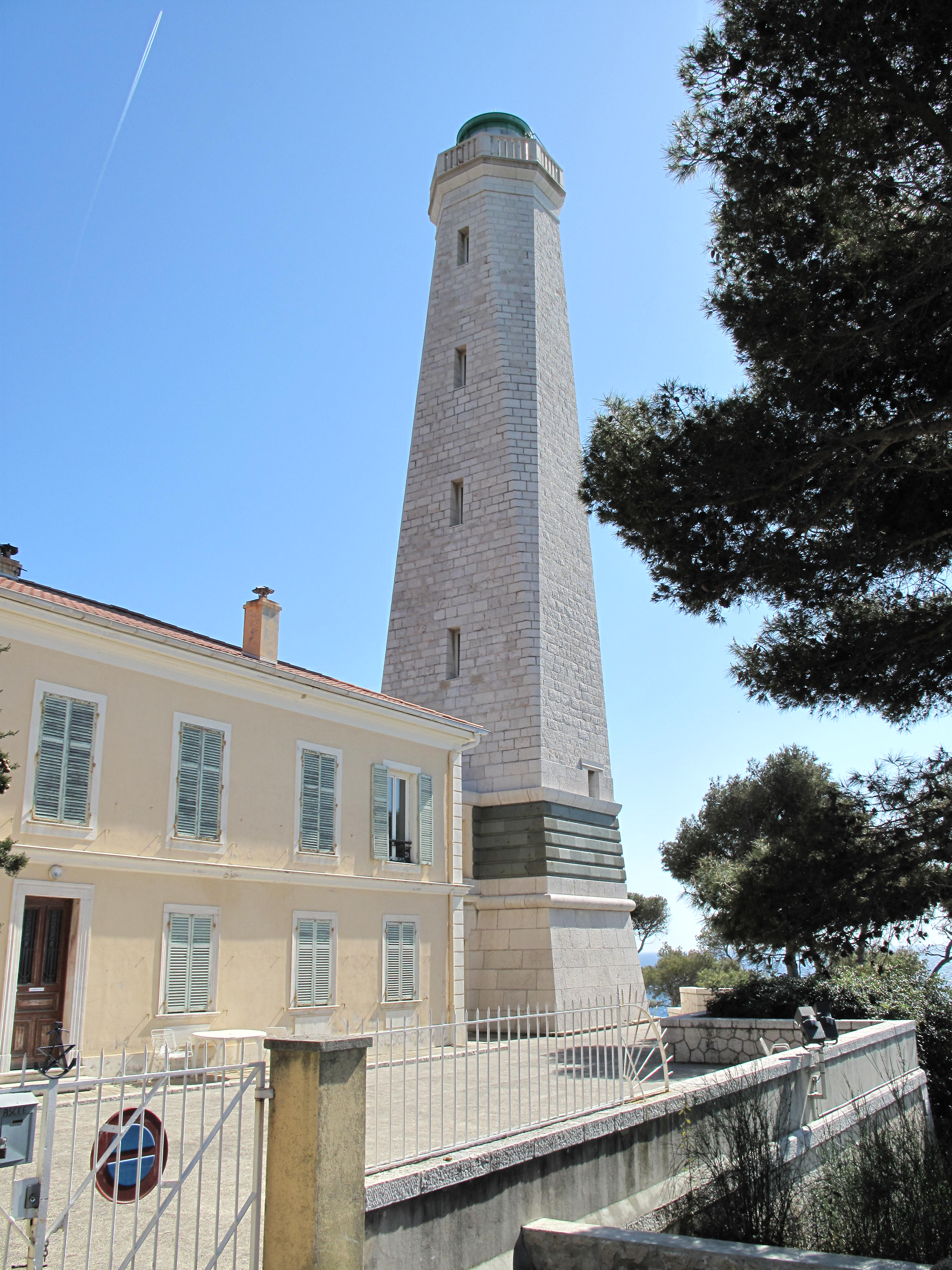
Cap Ferrat lighthouse

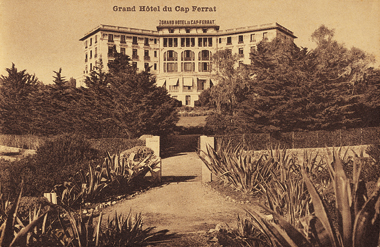
The historic Grand Hotel in 1908

Nicknamed as one of the pearls on the French Riviera, the fishing village is known for its vegetation and beaches, close to other popular resorts such as Èze, the Principality of Monaco and Cannes.

=== Beaches ===
Paloma beach southeast of the port, on the north side small peninsula (St Hospice). Being on a northeast-facing shore and at the base of some tall cliffs. The location is about a 5–10 minutes walk from the port.

Passable beach is on the northwest side of the main peninsula, past the Office de Tourisme and past the zoo (parc zoologique). It's west-facing, with a view across the Rade de Villefranche.

Cro de Peï Pin is the biggest beach, located just north of the port at the Anse Lilong (the bay between the main peninsula and the smaller Ste Hospice peninsula), facing eastward into the Baie des Fourmis and the Tete de Chene. There's a public parking lot alongside the beach.

=== Le Zoo Parc du Cap-Ferrat ===
The Zoo du Cap-Ferrat, which closed down in 2011, had an impressive collection of fauna and flora. There were over 300 varieties of plants, including succulents and cacti. There were also eucalyptus trees that were over 100 years old. A variety of animals also resided in the zoo.

=== St Hospice ===
There is a very large bronze statue of the Madonna and Child, the early-19th century chapel, and a military cemetery for the 1914-18 war.

=== Le Phare ===
A highlight of St-Jean-Cap-Ferrat is the lighthouse, built in 1862 by decision of Napoleon III who wanted to equip the French littoral with a semaphoric chain. The goal was to ensure a monitoring of navigation, transmit messages to the ships, organize help in the event of maritime disasters, and take part in the first maritime meteorological observations.

=== Port de Saint-Jean-Cap-Ferrat ===
This is a small marina with 560 berths. It is very well-sheltered and quiet, located on the French Riviera.

=== Grand-Hôtel du Cap-Ferrat ===
Built in 1908, this stately white palace has hosted many worldwide personalities since it was erected, such as Paul Deschanel, George W. Bush, and Bill Clinton, Princess Louise, Duchess of Argyll, Queen Victoria's daughter, who remained a guest for many seasons and was often visited by her brother the Prince Arthur, Duke of Connaught and Strathearn, who lived for twenty years on Cap Ferrat.

== Culture ==
During the Belle Époque the Cap-Ferrat was already the vacation resort of the world elite: the great names of the era came there during winter to enjoy its climate and quality of life. In his song "I Went to a Marvellous Party," Noël Coward included the lyric Living in error/With Maud at Cap Ferrat/Which couldn't be right.

=== Musée Île-de-France ===
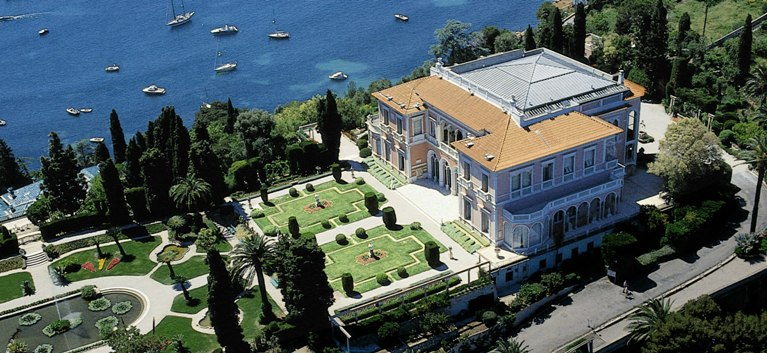
Villa Ephrussi de Rothschild

Cap-Ferrat harbour

The Villa Ephrussi de Rothschild (or Musée Île-de-France) is an Italian-style villa built between 1905 and 1912 on the request of Baronness Béatrice Ephrussi de Rothschild. It contains a large art collection and fine furnishing. The villa grounds have an extensive set of seven gardens designed in different styles: French Traditional, Florentine, Spanish, Exotic, Lapidary, Japanese, and Provençal. The villa is located at the northern end (entrance) of the peninsula.

=== Les Azuriales Opera Festival ===
The Les Azuriales Opera Festival, founded in 1997, takes place each year in August in Villa Ephrussi de Rothschild.

=== Local cuisine ===
With its coastal location, cuisine in Saint-Jean-Cap-Ferrat is based around seafood. Dishes include escalope de mérou au citron, which is sea bass steaks in lime; salmon tournedos with truffles; cod and vegetables in garlic sauce; and skate with capers. Meat dishes include estouffade de sanglier (wild boar) and fillet de beef rossini cooked with foie gras.

== Economy ==
One of Saint-Jean-Cap-Ferrat's main sources of income is tourism. The main attractions of Saint-Jean-Cap-Ferrat are its pleasant climate, its history, and its yacht harbor, which attract thousands of tourists every year. Saint-Jean-Cap-Ferrat also has a small fishing port.

Another Saint-Jean-Cap-Ferrat's source of income is the hotel industry and the real estate sector, which is dynamic in the region. In 2012 Cap Ferrat was named as the second most expensive residential location in the world, after Monaco.

== Transportation ==
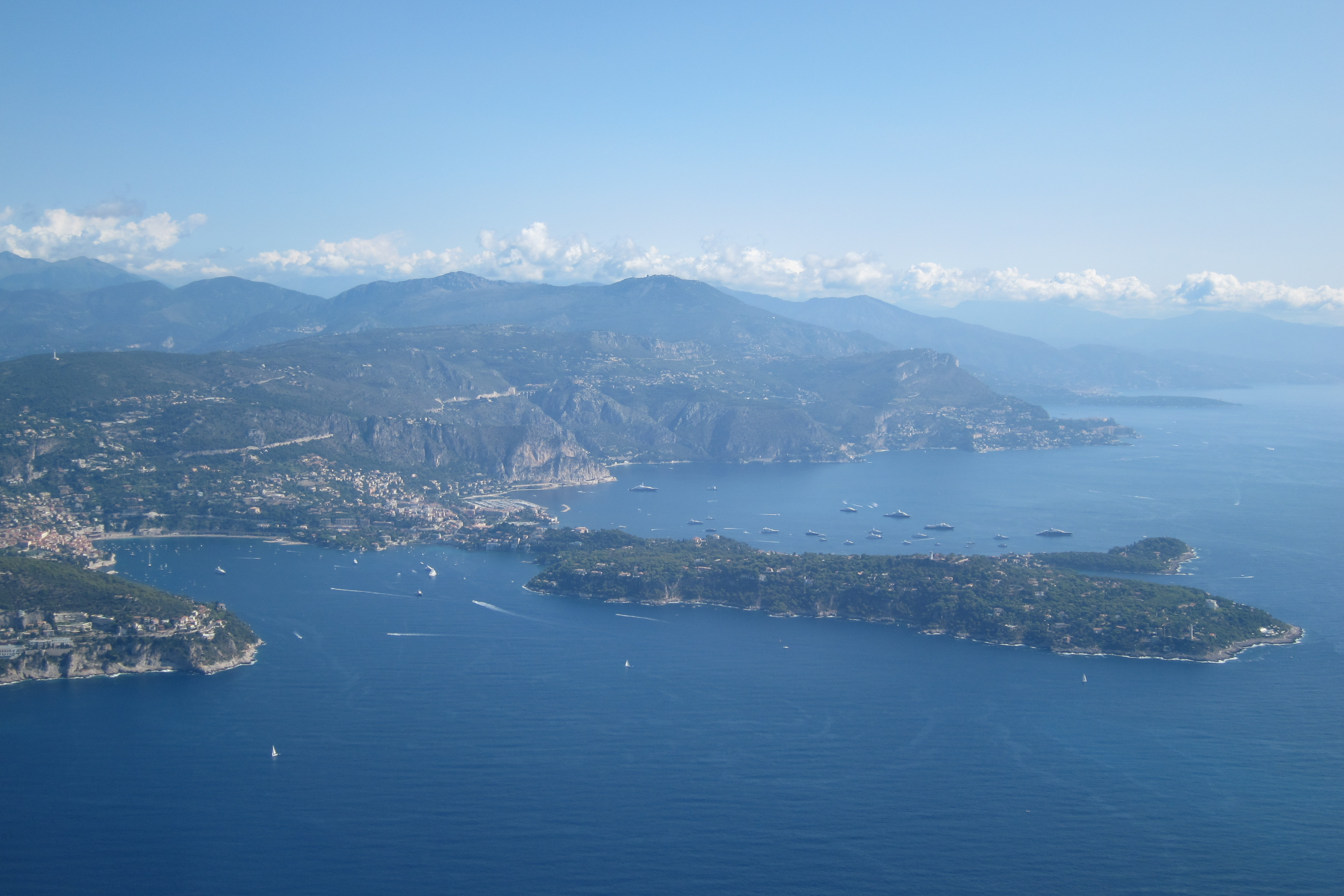
Aerial view of the peninsula

Train. The Nice-Ventimiglia train along the coast stops at Villefranche-sur-Mer and Beaulieu-sur-Mer. There are buses to the Cap-Ferrat from Nice's central bus station.

Air: The nearest airports are Toulon-Hyères, Nice-Côte d'Azur, Marseille-Provence.

== See also ==
- Communes of the Alpes-Maritimes department
