= Barroso =

Barroso may refer to:

== Places ==
- Barroso (region), Portugal
- Barroso, Minas Gerais, Brazil

== Other use ==
- Barroso (surname)
- Barroso Commission, the European Commission led by José Manuel Barroso from 2004 to 2014
- Brazilian ironclad Barroso, a gunboat in service from 1866 to 1882
- Brazilian corvette Barroso, a corvette in service since 2008
