= Bajío de San José =

Town in Jalisco, Mexico

Coordinates: 21°41′N 102°07′W

Bajío de San José is a town (delegación) in the Municipality of Encarnación de Díaz in Jalisco, Mexico. It is composed of two villages: Rangel, which was founded in the 19th century within the Hacienda de Rangel, and Bajío de San José. Both towns add up to approximately 8,000 inhabitants. The town is noted for dairy farms, dairy products, and retail furniture. Bread, especially bolillo and conchas; pork, especially chicharron prensado (fried pork), and chili are traditional meals, in some places still produced using traditional recipes.

Bajío de San Jose is 30 minutes away from the city of Aguascalientes. Citizens from Bajío de San Jose have access to 2 highways going north to Aguascalientes, south to Encarnación de Díaz, east to El Tecuán and south to Encarnacion de Diaz. Being on the edge of Jalisco's state line its only six km away from the border state line of Jalisco with Aguascalientes.

Hacienda de Rangel was part of the Rincon Gallardo emporium (mayorazgo). The Rincon Gallardo family sold Hacienda to Don Nicolas Cuellar and smaller sections to other farmers. Don Nicolas Cuellar rebuilt the old temple of Nuestra Senora del Refugio (1866), which is the only historical landmark preserved in town.

== Locally observed holidays ==
- February 11 — Festival of the hermitage honoring the Virgen de Lourdes Day
- May 1 — San José Obrero Day
- July 4 — Nuestra Señora del Refugio

== Economy and industry ==
The town is still part of the region called "Los Altos de Jalisco", which is one important milkshed for the center of Mexico. Dairy products manufacturing has increased recently. Agriculture is also important, mainly beekeeping, and crops like chili pepper, corn and beans. Retail industry is also important, especially furniture warehouses and livestock forage.

The availability of water and fertile land in the hands of competitive private farmers, has been the most important factor behind a buoyant economy since the 1980s. It is one of few places in the region with only private-owned farms (most towns are also partially Ejidos, a communal type of land ownership in Mexico). Since farming has not been employment intensive, younger generations tend to emigrate to Aguascalientes or the United States for better opportunities, specifically California and Texas. The sustainability of farming is now being challenged by the depletion of underground water reservoirs. The production of alfalfa and other water intensive crops accelerates the depletion of the water table by an estimated 1 meter per year.

== Religion ==
Catholicism is practiced by most residents. In fact, this region was part of the Cristero War.
