= Pierre Barbe =

French architect (1900–2004)

- Born: 28 March 1900
- Died: 26 April 2004 (aged 104)
- Occupation: Architect

Pierre Barbe (28 March 1900 – 26 April 2004) was a French architect.

Barbe became the "house architect" for the Schlumberger family. He designed Pierre Schlumberger's house on Lazy Lane in Houston, Texas. For Pierre and his first wife Claire he restored a holiday house on the Normandy coast, and designed a new house at Tourettes-sur-Loup on the Riviera.

For Pierre and his second wife São, he renovated their apartment in Sutton Place, New York, and an 18th-century hôtel particulier in the Rue Férou, Paris. From 1965 to 1975, for Pierre and São Schlumberger, he restored and modernised the Quinta do Vinagre, a large estate on the Portuguese coast.

== Biography ==
Initially a cartoonist, he obtained his architecture degree from the École des Beaux-Arts in 1928. He quickly turned his attention to interior design and decoration for shops and apartments.

A founding member of the Union of Modern Artists in 1929, he was, in the same year, the deputy delegate alongside Le Corbusier at the CIAM in Frankfurt. Influenced by modernism, his furniture and models were exhibited at the annual UAM salons.

This modernist period, marked by numerous renovations of apartments, mansions, and castles, reached its peak with the transformation of the Hôtel Lambiotte in Neuilly-sur-Seine between 1931 and 1934, which earned Pierre Barbe the gold medal at the 6th Milan Triennial in 1936 (the Hôtel Lambiotte was added to the supplementary inventory of historic monuments by decree on July 11, 1984).

In 1930, he and Louise Venard—his partner from 1925 until her death in 1955—founded a tapestry and trimmings workshop called “Installation Meubles Tissus” (IMT), which began by producing Pierre Barbe's furniture.

During the 1930s, Pierre Barbe began to distance himself, without abandoning it entirely, from the Functionalism (architecture) and international style that permeated the UAM (which he left in 1934), returning to a certain bourgeois classicism, particularly in northern France and Belgium.

From 1947, he participated in the redevelopment of the Villa Cavrois.

The creation of large estates was a culmination of Barbe's work. At the Domaine des Treilles (from 1961 to 1982, in the municipalities of Tourtour and Flayosc, Var), he restored and built a group of functional houses in the Provençal style.

Rejecting dogmatism, Pierre Barbe devoted himself to synthesizing classicism and modernity.

Pierre Barbe continued his work until the age of 94, before passing away at the age of 104. The press paid tribute to him on this occasion.
