= Pierre Schlumberger =

American oil executive

- Born: 1914
- Died: February 18, 1986 (aged 71–72)
- Occupation: Businessman
- Title: President and CEO, Schlumberger
- Term: 1956–1965
- Successor: Jean Riboud
- Spouse(s): Claire Simone Schwob d'Héricourt (died 1959) Maria "São" da Conceição Diniz (m. 1961)
- Children: 7
- Parent: Marcel Schlumberger

Pierre Schlumberger (June 12, 1914 – February 18, 1986) was a French-born American businessman. He was the chief executive of Schlumberger, the world's largest oilfield services company.

== Early life ==
Schlumberger was born June 12, 1914 in Paris, France, the second of three children, to Marcel Schlumberger (1884–1953), a mechanical engineer and industrialist, and Jeanne Schlumberger (née Laurans; 1889–1983).

He hailed from an old, well established family that was part of the bourgeoisie of Mulhouse and Guebwiller, noted for politics, officials and industrial endeavours in the textile industry. His father, Marcel Schlumberger, co-founded Schlumberger, in 1926.

== Career ==
Schlumberger worked for Schlumberger for 25 years, rising to president and CEO in 1956 (Henri George Doll, Conrad Schlumberger's son-in-law, was the chairman), until he retired in 1965 and was succeeded by Jean Riboud. Under Pierre, the company ceased to be a family business, expanded into electronics, centralized its operations in Houston, Texas, and became a publicly traded company.

== Art collector ==
Schlumberger acquired a "superlative collection of modern art", including works by Pierre Bonnard, Henri Matisse, and Piet Mondrian; then with his second wife, São, they expanded to include contemporary artists, adding works by artists including Mark Rothko, Ad Reinhardt, Andy Warhol, and Robert Rauschenberg. Their collection was auctioned by Sotheby's over four days in November 2014, who called them "two of the most visionary collectors of the Twentieth Century."

Schlumberger co-founded the Contemporary Arts Museum Houston.

== Personal life ==
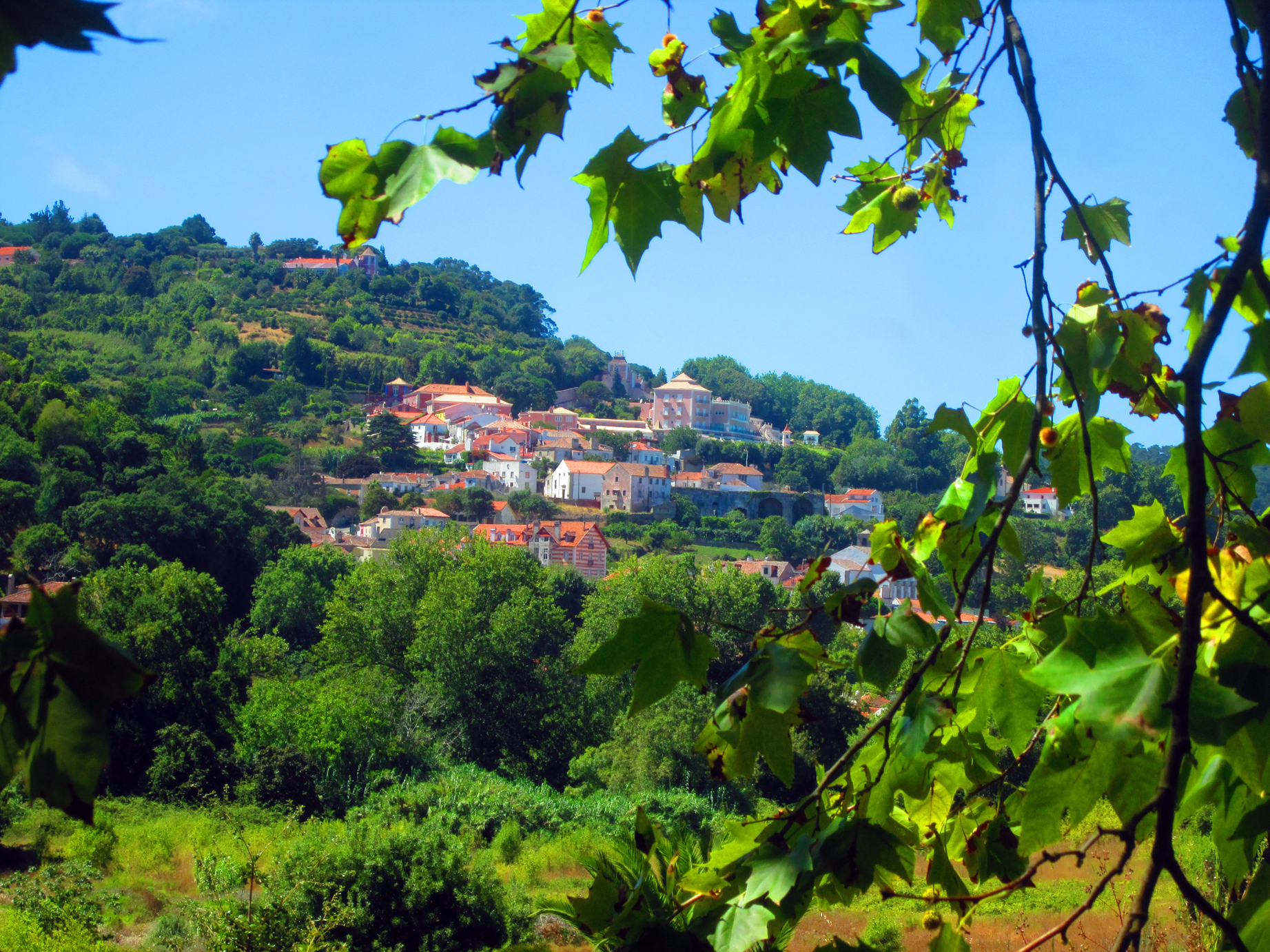
Quinta do Vinagre

Schlumberger's first wife, Claire Simone Schwob d'Héricourt (1917–1959), coming from a jewish French family, was the daughter of film producer Jacques Schwob d'Héricourt; they were married for two decades and had five children before she died from a stroke in 1959.

- Anne-Marie Louise Schlumberger (1939–2025), a farmer and agriculturist married three times, had three sons and two stepchildren.
- Pierre Marcel Schlumberger (1942–2020), an attorney, married to Lesley McCary, had two daughters.
- Catherine Claire Schlumberger (1943–1990)
- Christiane Claire Schlumberger (born 1946)
- Jacques Pierre Schlumberger (born 1948)

In 1961, he married Maria "São" da Conceição Diniz (1929–2007), who had been married to Pedro Bessone Basto, a Portuguese "boulevardier", for less than a year. He was 47, she was 32. They lived in Houston until he was ousted as CEO in "a family coup" in 1965 and moved to New York City and then Paris. His house in Lazy Lane in Houston was designed by the family's French architect Pierre Barbe. Barbe also restored a holiday home for them on the Normandy coast and designed a new house at Tourrettes-sur-Loup on the Riviera.

They had 2 children:

- Paul Albert Schlumberger (born 1962)
- Victoire Marie Schlumberger (born 1968)

They lived in an 18th-century hôtel particulier in the Rue Férou, next door to Man Ray, restored by Barbe, with interior design by Valerian Rybar in "a provocative mix of classic and modern styles". They were prominent in New York and Paris society and hosted guests including Yves Saint Laurent, Andy Warhol, Rudolf Nureyev, Robert Rauschenberg, Christo, Man Ray, Salvador Dalí, and Roy Lichtenstein.

In 1964, he bought Quinta do Vinagre, a 16th-century manor with 103 acres (42 ha) near Sintra, Portugal, built for the local bishop. From 1965 to 1975, Barbe restored and updated the 18-bedroom property. In 1968, Schlumberger and Antenor Patiño both held parties at their Portuguese estates with over 1,000 guests including Gina Lollobrigida, Audrey Hepburn, Zsa Zsa Gabor, Douglas Fairbanks Jr., and Henry Ford II. The singer Madonna was thought to have bought it for €18 million in 2017, but instead chose a smaller more "manageable" house nearby.

Schlumberger, an invalid from an earlier stroke, died in Paris in 1986.
