= Ricardo Barroso Barroso =

Mexican architect, interior designer and artist

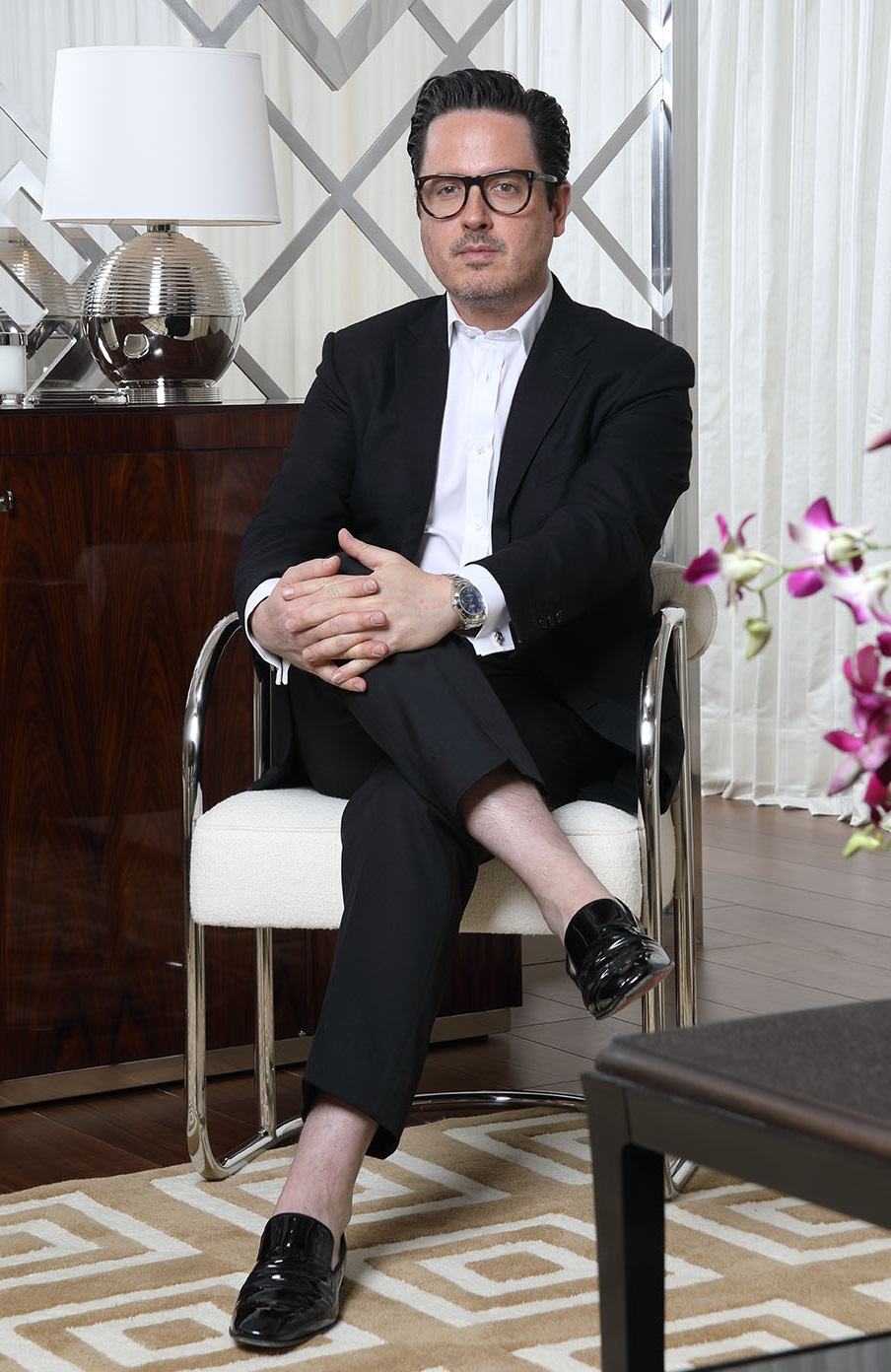
- Born: October 30, 1973 (47 years); Mexico City, Mexico
- Occupations: Architect; Interior designer Plastic artist
- Years active: 1995–present
- Notable work: Ricardo Barroso Interiors (2016)

Ricardo Barroso Barroso (born October 30, 1973, Mexico City) is a Mexican architect, interior designer and plastic artist, recognized as "one of the greatest exponents of interior design in Mexico" by Forbes magazine, which also included him in its list of the "50 most creative Mexicans in the world".

== Early life and education ==
Barroso Barroso was born in Mexico City on October 30, 1973. Inspired by the work of French interior designer Valerian Rybar, he became interested since his youth in the world of art and decoration. He studied Business Administration and later moved to Monterrey to begin a career in Architecture.

== Career ==
=== 1990s and 2000s ===
After obtaining his degree and working professionally with companies like Liewrant, Macotela and Serrano Arquitectos, in the late 1990s he decided to found Barroso Arquitectos, his own firm.

In 2007 he opened a showroom with an emphasis on interior design and decoration, and a year later founded a furniture and accessories gallery at the Centro de Arquitectura y Diseño (CAD) in the Mexican capital. He subsequently launched his brand in luxury retail chains such as Saks Fifth Avenue and Casa Palacio, selling furniture, rugs and other accessories of his own making, and obtained representation from brands such as Ralph Lauren Home, Scalamandre, Baker Furniture, Matouk and Pratesi.

=== 2010s and present ===
In 2015 Barroso Barroso published his first independent architectural design book titled Ricardo Barroso Interiors, with a foreword written by American actress, model and businesswoman Eva Longoria, a personal friend of the artist. The book features more than two hundred images of some of Barroso's designs during his career, including residences, airplanes and boats in cities like Madrid, Los Angeles, New York and Mexico City. In 2016 he founded a showroom in the Santa Fe area.

Barroso is a member of the College of Architecture of Mexico, the Mexican Association of Interior Architecture and the Federation of Mexican Colleges of Architects, and throughout his career he has won several awards and recognitions, among them the National Interior Design Award in Residential Interiors -given by the Mexican Association of Interior Architecture- and the Icons of Design Award in the International Mexican Designer category -from Architectural Digest magazine-, in addition to being part of the list of the "50 most creative Mexicans in the world" in 2015, elaborated by Forbes magazine.

Among his main influences, Barroso has mentioned artists like Yves Klein, Franz Kline, Richard Serra, Valerian Rybar, Luis Barragán, Oscar Niemeyer and Teodoro González de León, among others.

== Awards and recognition ==
- 2014 – Architectural Digest Mexico – Best International Designer
- 2015 – Forbes Mexico – 28th position in the list of the "50 most creative Mexicans in the world"
- Mexican Association of Interior Architecture – National Award for Interior Design in Residential Interiors

== Published works ==
- 2002 – Interiores Mexicanos
- 2003 – Interiores Mexicanos II
- 2006 – Decoración
- 2007 – Apartamentos
- 2007 – Estancias
- 2010 – Arquitectura y diseño de interiores
- 2010 – Iluminación
- 2013 – Espacios en arquitectura IV
- 2015 – Dormitorios
- 2015 – Ricardo Barroso Interiors (ISBN 9786074373363)
