= Encarnación de Díaz =

- Municipality and town
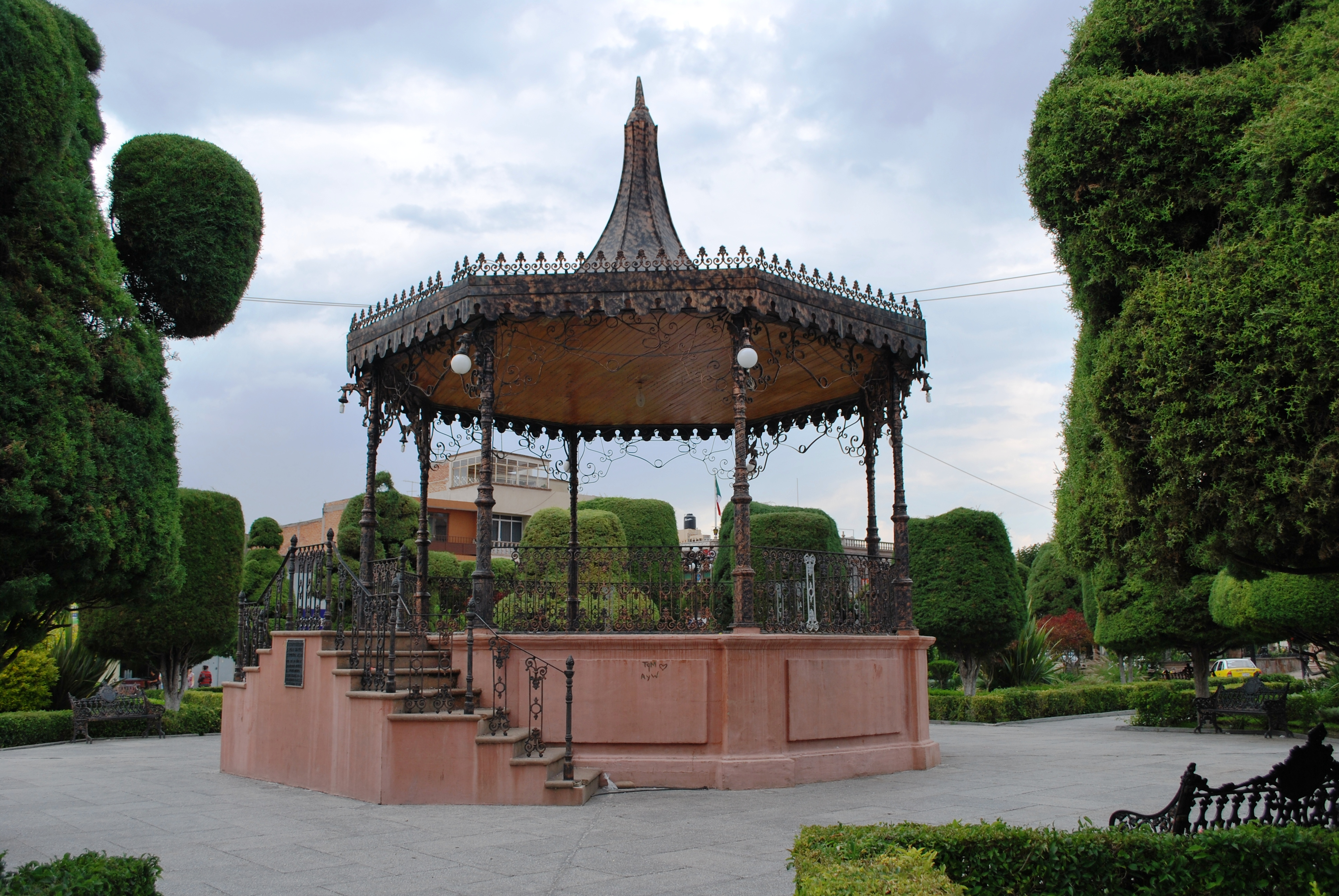
- Kiosk in the main plaza

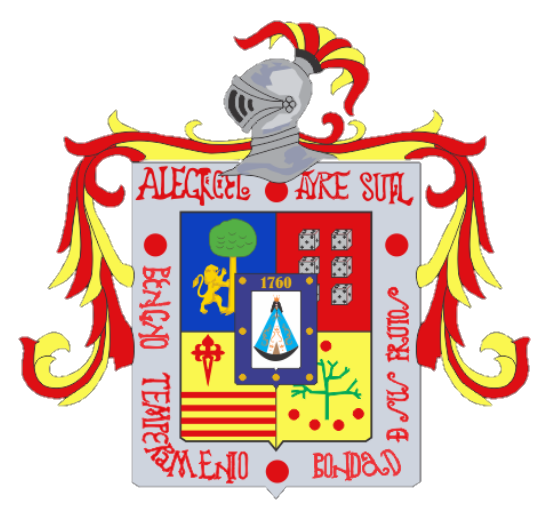
- Coat of arms

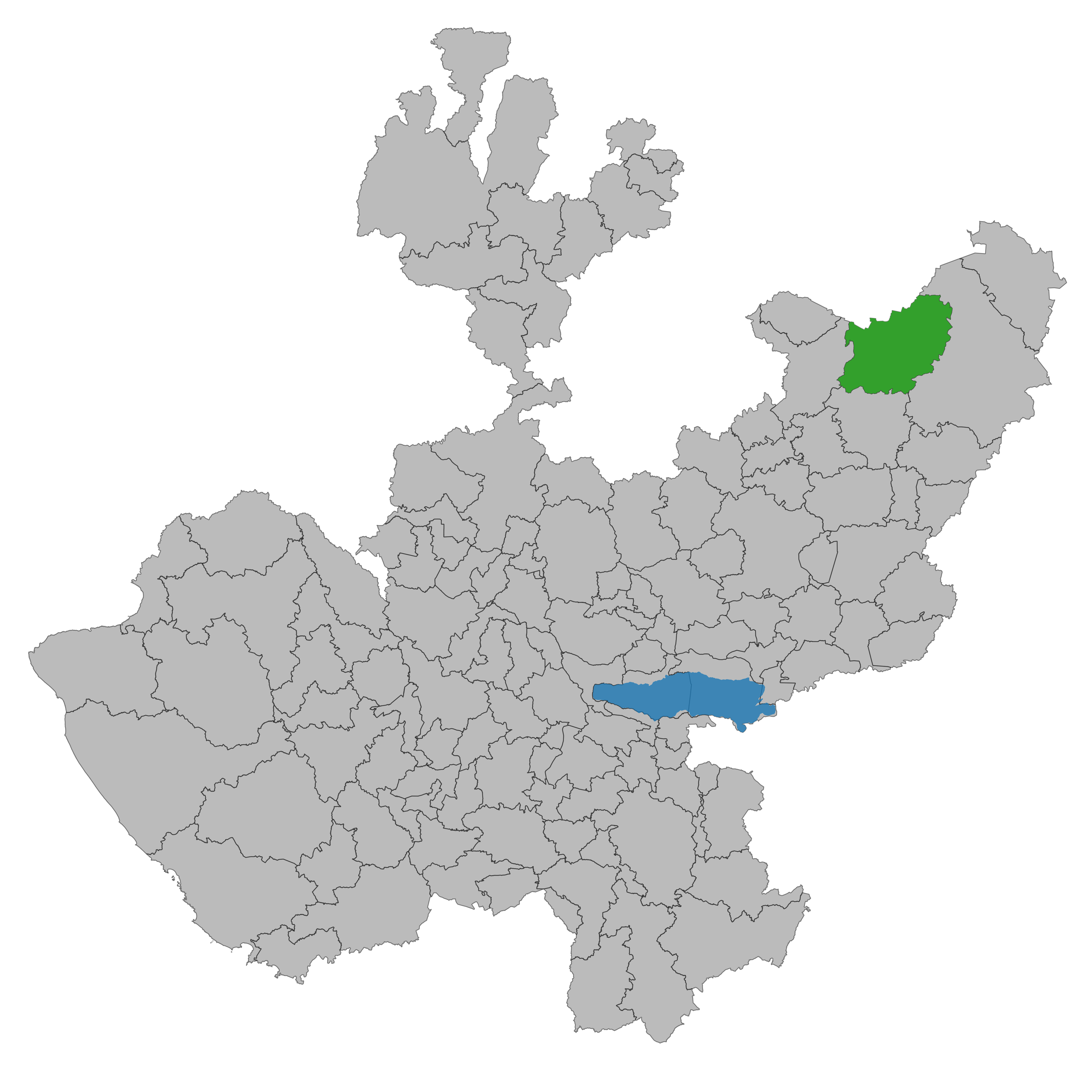
- Location within the state of Jalisco

- Location within Mexico
- Coordinates: 21°31′N 102°14′W
- Country: Mexico
- State: Jalisco
- Municipality: Encarnación de Díaz
- Founded: 1760

Government
  - Municipal President: Gilberto Antonio Palomar González

Area
  - Total: 1,220.16 km^{2} (471.11 sq mi)
  - Town: 9.4 km^{2} (3.6 sq mi)

Population (2010)
  - Total: 51,396
  - Density: 42.122/km^{2} (109.10/sq mi)
  - Town: 27,833
  - Town density: 3,000/km^{2} (7,700/sq mi)

Encarnación de Díaz is a town and municipality located in the far northeast of the state of Jalisco in north-central Mexico. It is located in a natural pass that connects the Los Altos region of Jalisco to points north, and from pre-Hispanic times until the 20th century, it was a major thoroughfare for north-south travel. The town began as a way station along a road built through this pass in the 17th century, formally becoming a town in 1760. It began to function as a municipality in the latter 19th century, but this status was not confirmed until the early 20th. Transport, along with numerous prosperous haciendas supported the economy of the area until the early 20th century, when travel patterns and the Mexican Revolution spurred its decline. In the 1920s, it was a centre of rebellion during the Cristero War, and the town contains Mexico's only museum exclusively dedicated to this episode in history. It also contains a museum dedicated to various naturally occurring mummies which have been found in the municipal cemetery.

== The town ==
Because of the area's prosperity from colonial times to the Porfirio Díaz period, the town has about 180 constructions with historical value. The main landmarks are the Encarnación parish, the Señor de Misericordia Cemetery, the Municipal Palace, the Jesús, María y José Sanctuary, Nuestra Señora de Guadalupe church and the Dr. Pedro de Alba, and the Astrónomo Angel Anguiano Limón Library.

One local custom that is still observed is the closing of businesses on Thursday afternoons. This is done because many businesses are open half a day on Sunday. The most important celebration of the year is Candlemas in honor of the image of Our Lady of Incarnation. This extends from 25 January to 9 February, with the peak on 2 February. The image is honored with masses, processions, bullfights, cockfights, horse races, parades, cultural events, and general fair rides and games. In the homes and restaurants of the area, typical dishes include corn ball soup, tamales, puchero, mole ranchero, pozole, birria, menudo, and meat with a chile Colorado sauce. Traditional drinks include pulque, tepache, tejuino, atole, and a drink made with cactus fruit. It is said that both John Paul II and the King of Spain have tried the town's sweet bread.

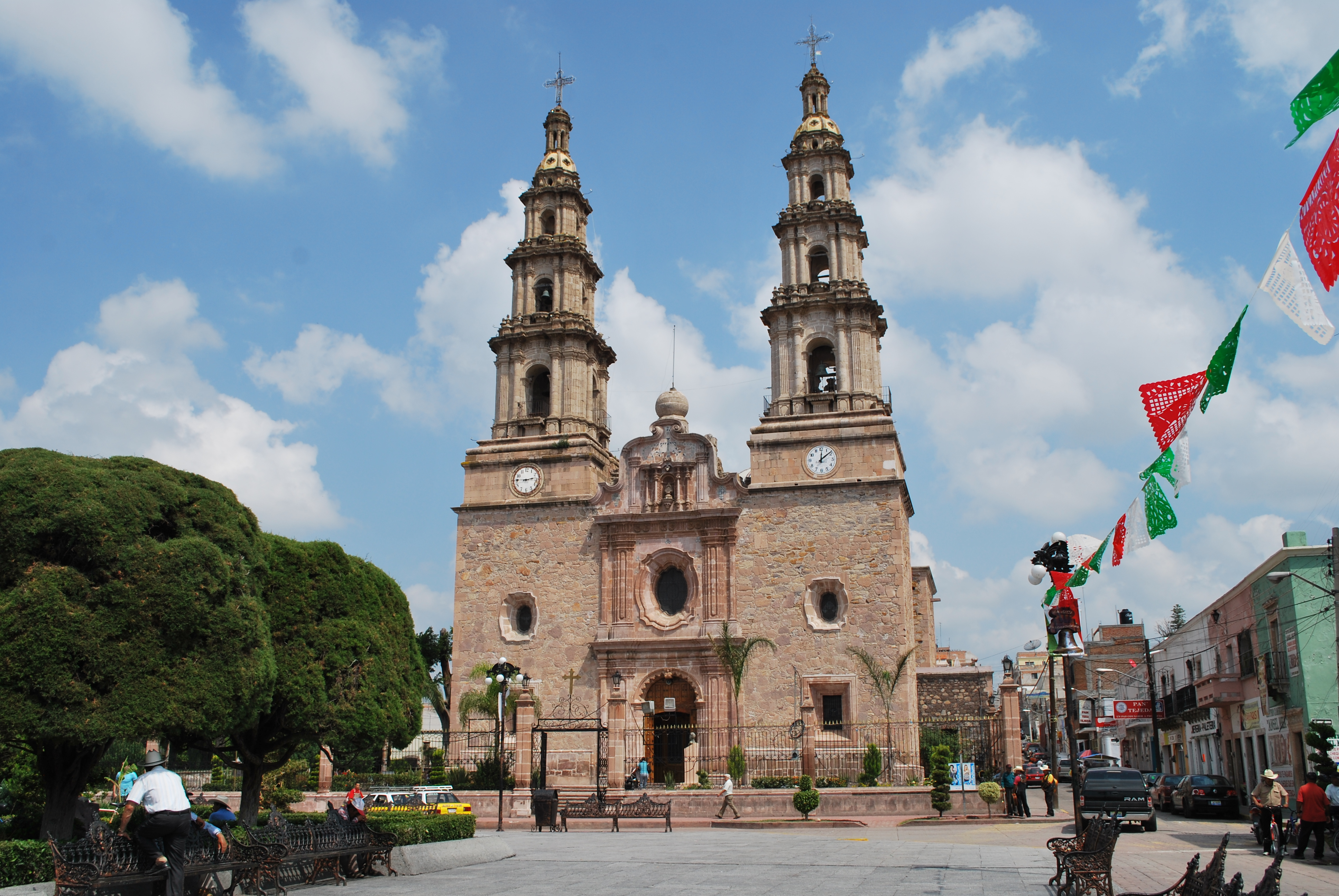
View of the parish church from the main plaza

The center of the town is the main square called the Plaza de Armas. Originally, this spot had a fountain that provided the community's potable water needs. This plaza contains a kiosk in the center, walking paths, benches and trees which have been cut into the shapes of animals.

Towering over the plaza is the Parish of Encarnación, built in Neoclassical style in 1791 from rubblework masonry and sandstone. The facade has two bell towers of three levels that contain Tuscan columns and entablatures with decorative scales and vegetative reliefs. These towers are topped by small cupolas. The main portal has two levels with vegetative reliefs topped by crests. This lower level has the main entrance whose keystone contains a cherub. The second level has a choral window and a central niche which contains an image of Our Lady of the Incarnation. There is also a large globe sculpted from sandstone. The interior has a Latin cross layout topped by Gothic vaults and the transept has an octagonal cupola. The main altar is Neoclassical made of marble and contains a replica of the namesake Virgin image. This virgin image is said to be the "cousin" of the image in San Juan de Los Lagos. The sacristy has a number of oil paintings and other religious art.

On the opposite side of the plaza is the municipal palace. This building was constructed in 1759 originally as a royal treasury (casa real). Later it became a municipal jail. After Independence, it was renovated to become the main governmental building. It is Neoclassical in design and it has unique arches in the front, which were roofed in 1834. There is also a mural dedicated to the Cristero War.

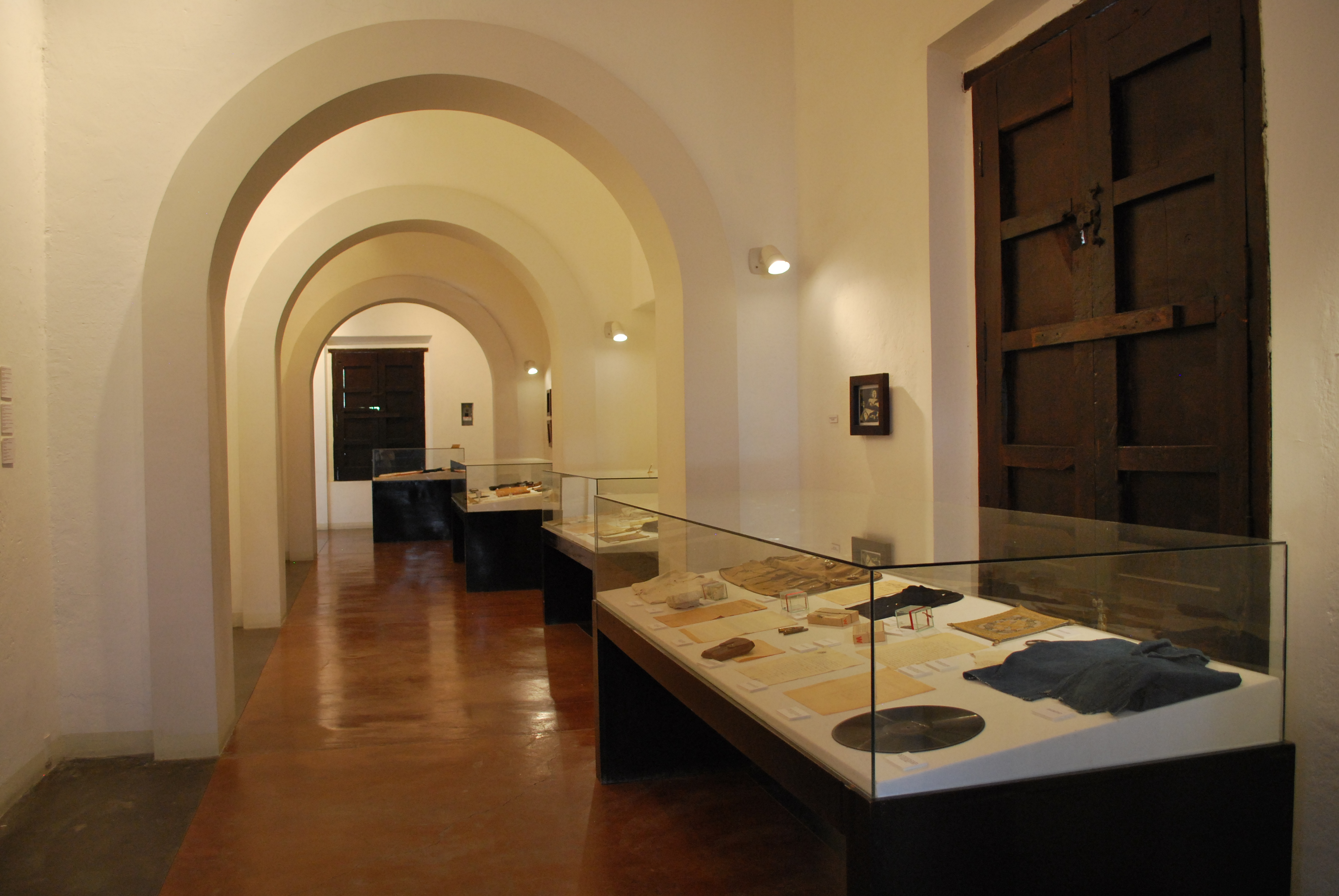
Hall inside the Cristero Museum

The area was a centre of rebellion during the Cristero War and is home to the Museo Cristero, dedicated to Captain Efrén Quesada Ibarra. The museum was founded by Alfredo Hernandez Quezada to promote the memory of the conflict. Although born in 1939, ten years after the end of the rebellion, his uncle Efren Quezada was an important leader of the movement. Hernandez dedicated thirty years of his life to the project, recording many of the interviews himself. It was reorganized and reopened in 2006 with the new official name of Centro de Estudios de Encarnación de Díaz. This museum is the only one of its kind in Mexico. It contains four halls, a projection room and a reading room. It contains over 200 books about this period in Mexico's history, newspapers and magazines from the time, a collection of 2,000 photographs, and over 200 hours of recorded testimony from eyewitnesses. Other items in its collection include the flag of the first regiment of rebels to take up arms in Huejuquilla El Alto in 1926 and the vest of Anacleto González Flores, a moral leader of the movement from Tepatitlán (since beatified by the Church). The Center has been involved in a number of research projects about the War including those related to the book "La Cristiada" by Editorial Clio and three videos by Enrique Krauze. It has also worked in cooperation with universities in Chicago, California, and Texas.

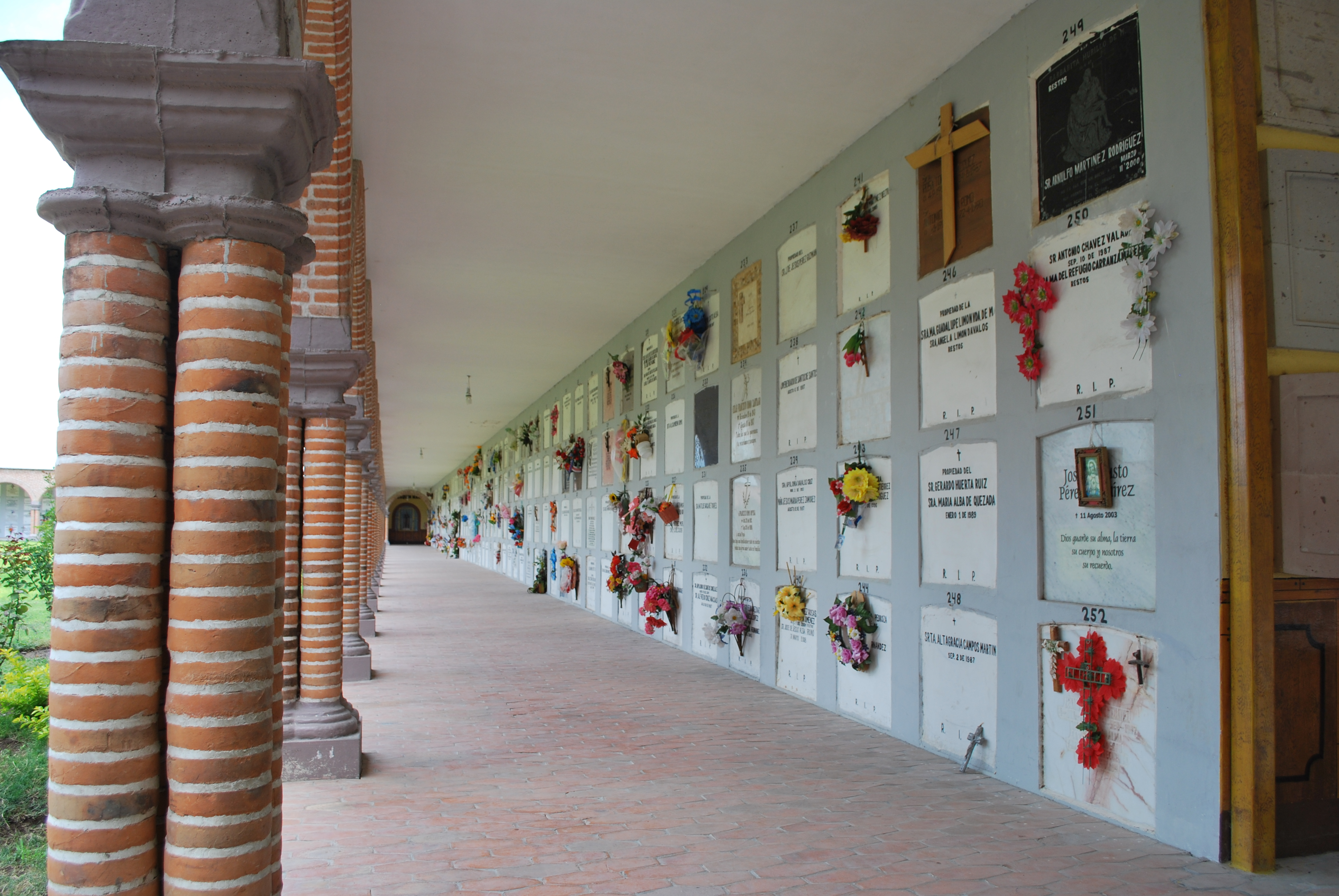
One side of the old section of the cemetery

The Señor de la Misericordia Cemetery is the oldest in the Los Altos region. Its construction was begun in 1826 as a patio surrounded by four corridors lined with crypts. In the centre, there is a large chapel made of white sandstone. The facade of this chapel has three arches and is decorated with vegetative motifs and some animal figures. The interior contains a mural of a crucified Christ with Byzantine influence, called the Señor de la Misericordia (Lord of Mercy). It was painted by Pablo Contreras in 1833. Many of the graves are not underground but rather are above-ground crypts. The old section is almost entirely of crypts. This form of interment and the dry climate of the area has produced a number of naturally occurring mummies, similar to those found in Guanajuato.

The government of the municipality has been promoting the cemetery as a tourist attraction in conjunction with the Las Ánimas de la Encarnación museum. The state Secretary of Tourism invested three million pesos to open the mummy museum, the second of its type in Mexico, opening in 2003. The museum is not only dedicated to the mummies, but also to the history of the cemetery and the region's funeral rites in general from the pre Hispanic period to the present.

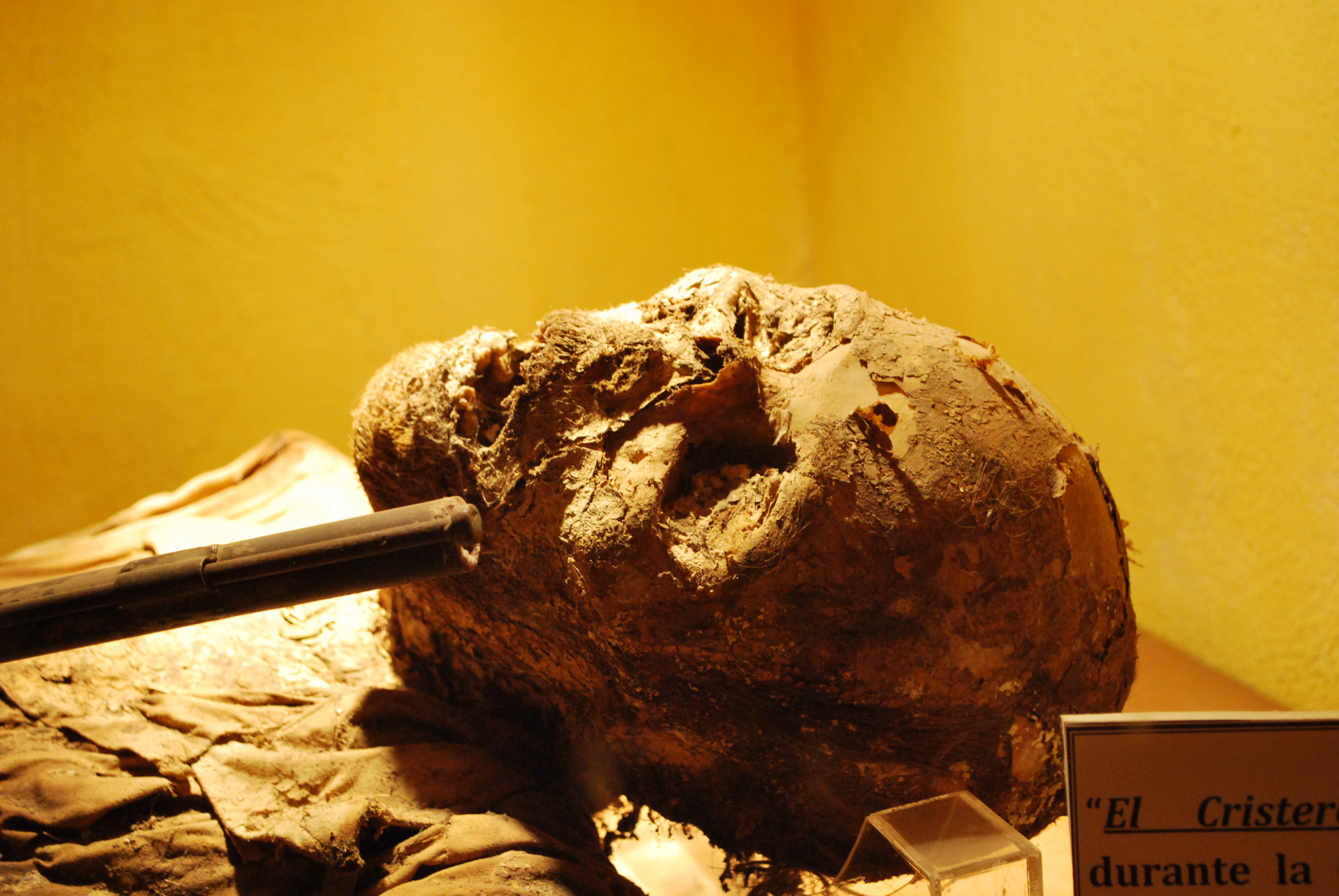
Mummy of man who died during Cristero War

Prior to the museum, the mummies long laid in storage and were only talked about locally and among cemetery workers. In the early 2000s, they attracted the attention of local and state authorities as a possible tourist attraction. The twenty-four on display are only a few of the hundreds that were found since the cemetery was constructed in the 19th century. Many of these corpses have been identified. One of these is of a boss named Lorenza, who was killed by a lover during a family conflict. Another is the body of Pedro Ramos, also known as Pedro Libres. In life, he earned a living hunting rabbit and was killed when he found a stash of colonial era gold. His clothing is the basis for the uniforms of the museum staff.

The museum contains five halls, pre-Hispanic, a crypt room which contains most of the mummies as well as an image of Our Lady of Solitude, one temporary exhibit hall called the Calaveras del Montón and two halls dedicated to religious objects, especially those connected to death. One of these is a coffin from 1860, which was built for the body of a young person between ten and fifteen years of age. In the latter halls, there are a number of mummies which have been separated for their unusual state of conservation. One of these is nicknamed Santanás, who was mummified over twenty years. One of the temporary exhibits was called "La Muerte Chiquita," consisting of photographs from an era when it was customary to record children on their deathbeds. Another exhibit was called "Claro Oscuro" consisting of photographs of cemeteries in Mexico.

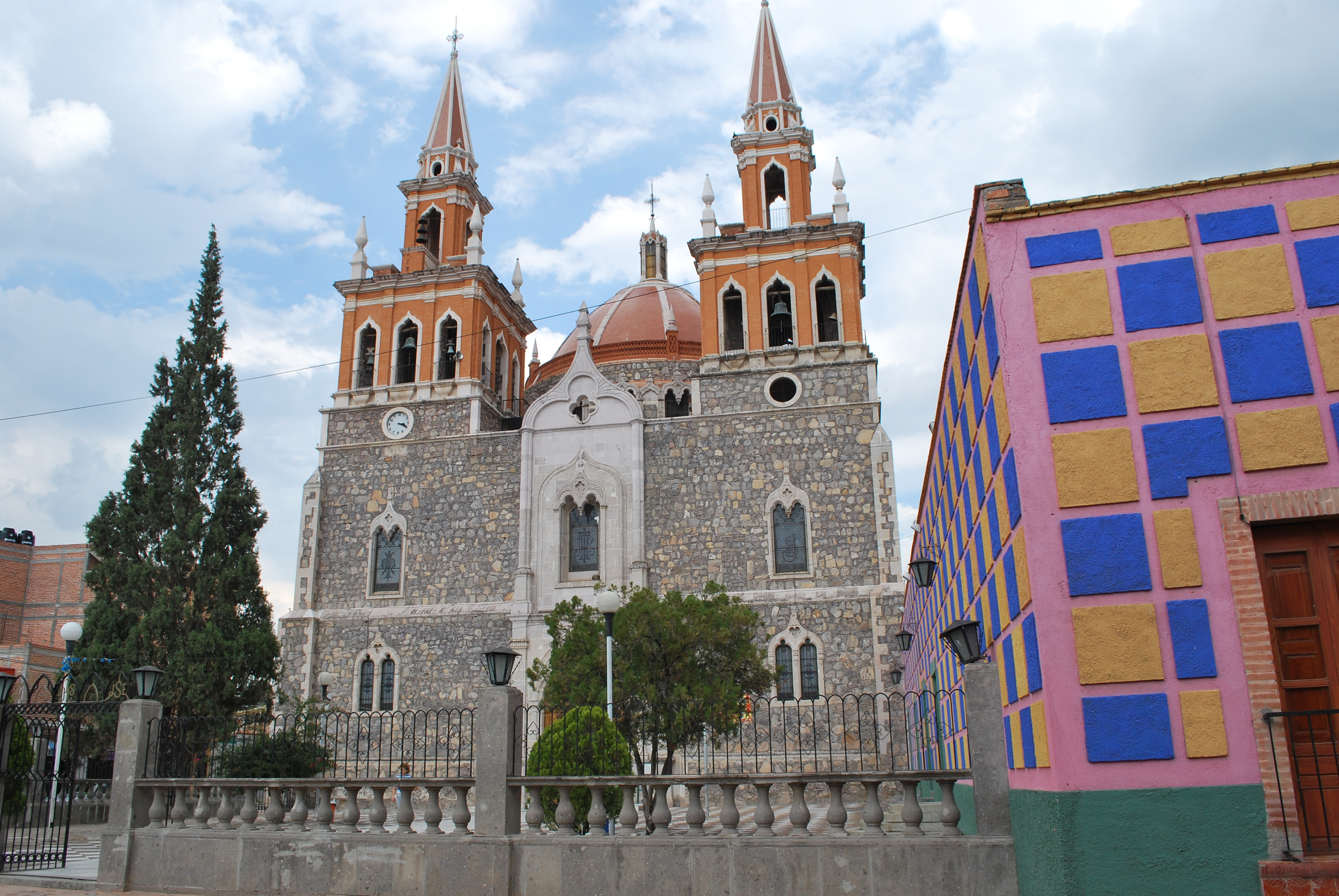
Jesús, María y José Sanctuary

The Jesús, María y José Sanctuary was built between 1865 and 1881 to fulfil a promise made by Father Juan C. Parga. The structure is an eclectic mix of styles with Neogothic dominating. The facade has two towers similar to those of the Guadalajara Cathedral. The main portal has two levels with pilasters and arches. The layout is that of a Greek cross with one circular nave covered by a large cupola lined by nerves and windows. The interior contains five Neogothic altars with the main one containing an image of the Holy Family.

The Astrónimo Anglo Anguiano Public Library was built between 1840 and 1845 by the Church to house a parochial school for girls. The walls are flat with some decorative elements of sandstone. However, its current decoration consists mostly of murals as well as a number of the buildings original oil paintings. The walls still contain phrases written on them when it was a school, with positive messages about women.

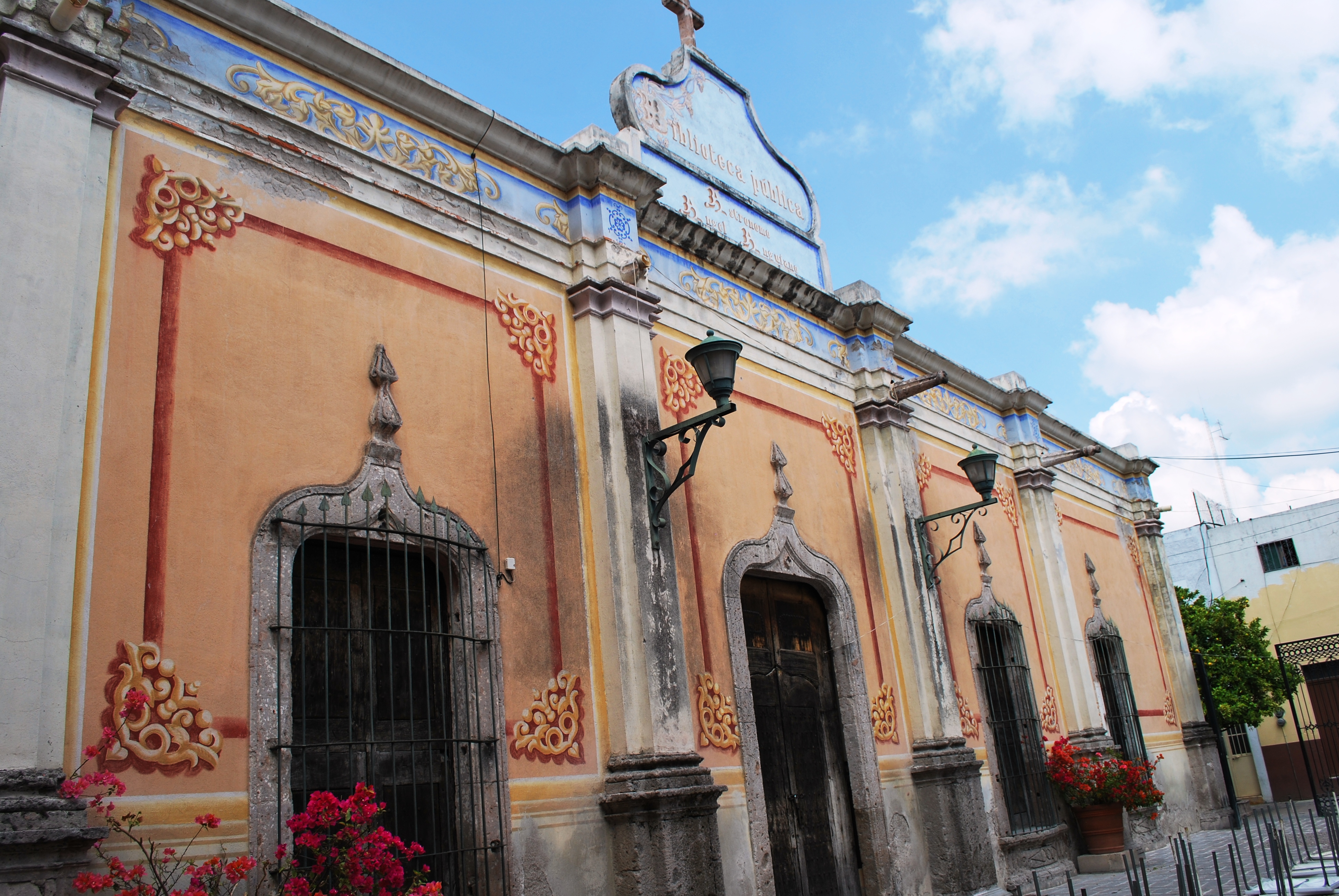
Municipal library

The Dr. Pedro de Alba Auditorium was constructed in the late 19th century by the church as a parochial school for boys. The facade is characterized by walls divided by pilasters made of brick on bases with oval windows and arches. The interior contains a concert hall and a gallery which are dedicated to temporary events. The vaults of the auditorium had a mural called Evolución del factor feminine (Evolution of the feminine factor) by artist Francisco Pérez; however, this was painted over in 2010. This was the request of Cardenal Juan Sandoval and Bishop José María de la Torre from Aguascalientes, due to images of nude women according to the newspaper Reforma. It was approved by the former municipal administration at a cost of 450,000 pesos.

The Nuestra Señora de Guadalupe Church was never finished since construction was begun in 1867. It is an eclectic design favoured in the Porfirio Díaz era covered in vaults and the tallest cupola in the municipality. Metal filigree decorates the architrave and transparent glass is found in the apse. Despite its relative newness, the sacristy is filled with a large collection of colonial-era religious paintings.

The Archbishop Jacinto López Romo House is located on Allende Street in the historic centre. The house contains many oil paintings of Biblical scenes.

The rail station was built in 1883 by the Ferrocarril Central Mexicano in part to ship the agricultural production of the area. The rail station is completely abandoned and unused although at one time it was an important stop. A Mexican film called Recuerdo del Porvenir was partially shot here.

== The municipality ==
The municipality is located in the northwest of the state of Jalisco in a region called Los Altos.It borders the municipalities of San Juan de los Lagos, Lagos de Moreno, and Teocaltiche with the state of Aguascalientes to the north. Ecclesiastically, it belongs to the Diocese of Aguascalientes. The municipality has 390 communities with the most important outside of the seat being Bajío de San José, Mesón de los Sauces, San Sebastián del Alamo and El Tecuán. These communities combine for a total area of 1,253 km^{2}.

As of 2005, only 345 people in the municipality spoke an indigenous language, but the number was up by 30 in 1995. Almost all profess the Catholic faith. As of the same year, the number of housing units was 10,496, over ninety per cent of which are privately owned. Basic services such as running water and electricity are available to just over 88% of households.

Most of the municipality's notable structures are from the colonial and Porfirian periods. These include the buildings on a large number of haciendas which were prosperous for centuries. The Hacienda de Mariquita was established in 1563 and is the oldest Spanish settlement of the area. Its founding is tied to that of San Juan de Los Lagos. Oral tradition says that the Casas Blancas Hacienda was founded by the first Galician family to the area in 1586, headed by Captain Alonso Lorenzo de Guerra. The initial large estate was divided up among his descendants. From the original, the old granary still stands. There are also a number of "casas-fuertes" built to house valuables in the 19th century.

El Puesto de San Miguel de Los Alba is the old hacienda mansion which dates from 1640. Its chapel contains the original Our Lady of the Incarnation image which gave the area its name. It also houses a number of religious objects and art from the 18th to 20th centuries, some of which are tied to the founding of the town. The Santa Bárbara Hacienda dates from the 17th century, founded by the Guerra family. The original mansion from the same time as well as a mill, a 19th-century house and the area's rail station is on this property.

The San José de Los Sauces Hacienda was founded at the end of the 17th century by Captain José Guerra Gallardo. In the 19th century, a soap factory was built on it. Today, it is one of the larger communities of the municipality, but many of the 17th and 18th-century structures still remain, such as an old inn, the area's first chapel and soap factory. However, the most important construction is the 19th-century church dedicated to Saint Joseph, with three naves in Neo Roman and Neogothic style. The Hacienda del Tecuán was founded in 1683 as part of the Mayorazgo de Ciénaga de Mata of the Rincón Gallardo family. It has a number of constructions from the 18th century but its main house is from the 19th century with significant French influence. Much of the hacienda's lands now belong to the Tecuán ejido which is known for its production of chili peppers, salsas, and silver crafts.

The Rangel Hacienda is now part of the Bajío de San José community. During the colonial period, it was part of a much larger land grant owned by the Rincón Gallardo family but it was separated out in the 19th century and sold to Nicolás Cuéllar. This owner built the Nuestra Señor del Refugio tempe in 1866. There is also a hermitage dedicated to Our Lady of Lourdes carved into the side of a canyon. The San Matías Hacienda belonged to the Guerra family and it was on this land that the town of Encarnación was founded. Important hacienda constructions include the main house, which was converted into a soap factory in 1876. In the 20th century, the hacienda became an important producer of bulls for bullfighting.

== Geography ==
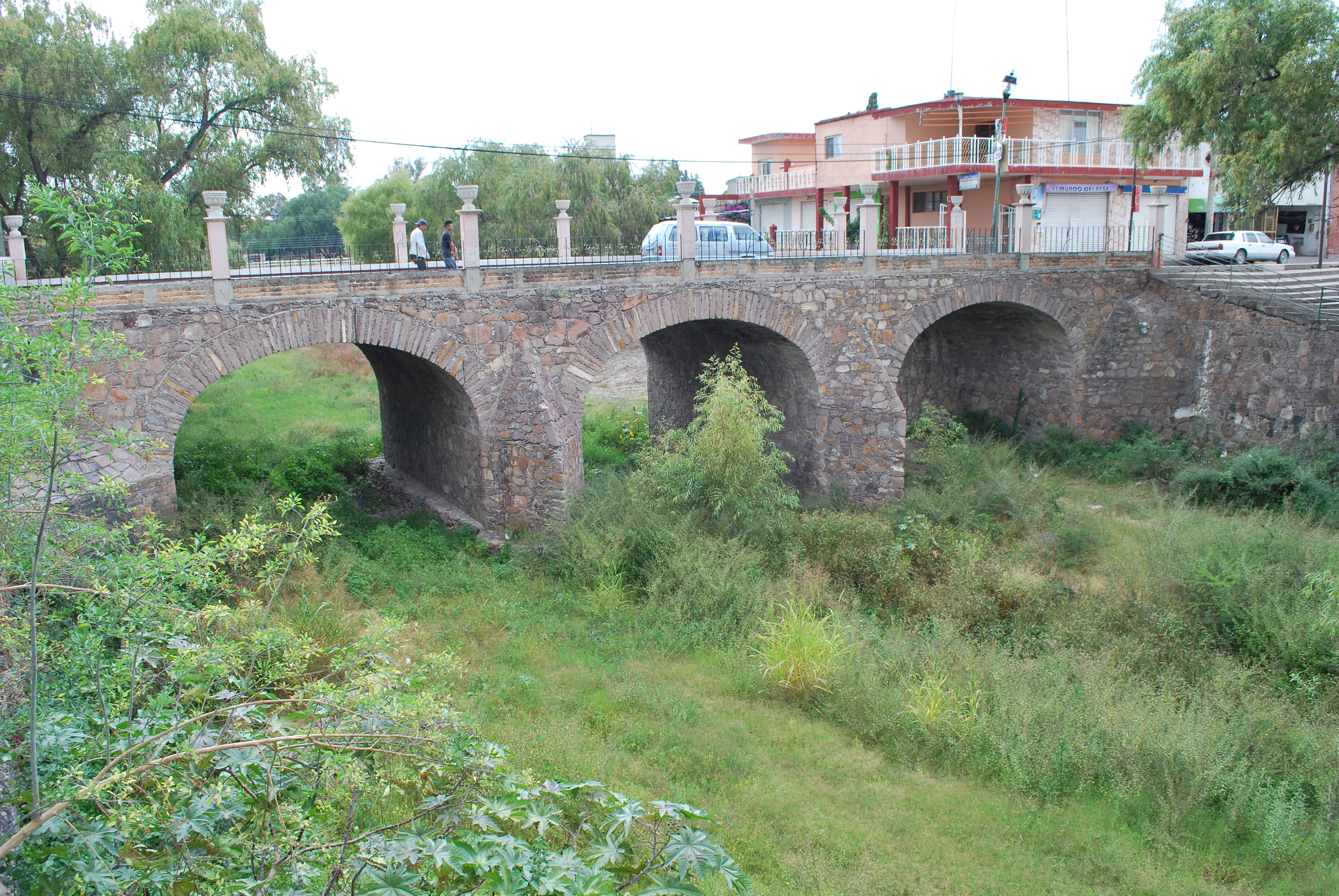
Stone bridge over the dry Encarnación River

The municipality consists of areas of sedimentary rock interspersed with basalt and other formations from volcanic activity. It belongs to the Sierra Madre Occidental with its topography is divided into four types depending on altitude, varying from 1800 to 2200 meters above sea level. The lowest elevations (1800 to 2000 masl) are located in the centre, where the municipal seat is. The average altitude to for the entity as a whole is 1851 masl.

The area is bounded by the Sierra de San Isidro to the east and the Sierra del Laurel to the west, forming a corridor. The highest elevations are located in the east and north of the seat. Notable peaks include Cerro de la Carbonera, Cerro del Rincón, Cerro de San Carlos and Cerro de Los Gallos. Most of the land is semi-flat (71%) or flat (27%) with only two percent being mountainous. Most of the land is between 1500 and 2100 meters above sea level with only twelve locations being between 2100 and 2700 masl.

=== Climate ===
The climate is mostly semi-arid and warm. Fall, winters, and spring are mostly dry and winters are mild, with an average annual temperature of 19C, varying between 28C and 10C. Average annual rainfall is 563,8 mm, with most rain falling in July. From November to February, dominant winds are from the northeast. From March to October they are from the southeast and generally stronger.

=== Hydrography ===
The main river in the municipality is the Encarnación River which flows into the municipal seat from the northeast. This river has two dams called La Cascarona and San Pedro. After the river leaves the municipality, its name changes to Río Verde. The rest of the municipality is filled with small streams and arroyos which are tributaries of the main river. Some of these include the Guadalupe, San Isidro, Calera, San Pedro, Soyate and El Trigo.

=== Flora and fauna ===
Most of the wild vegetation consists of huizache, mezquite, maguey, nopal cactus, and poplar trees. In the higher elevations, manzanilla dominates. Dominant wildlife consists of coyotes, hares, rabbits, foxes and deer, with some reptiles such as rattlesnakes and coral snakes.

== History ==
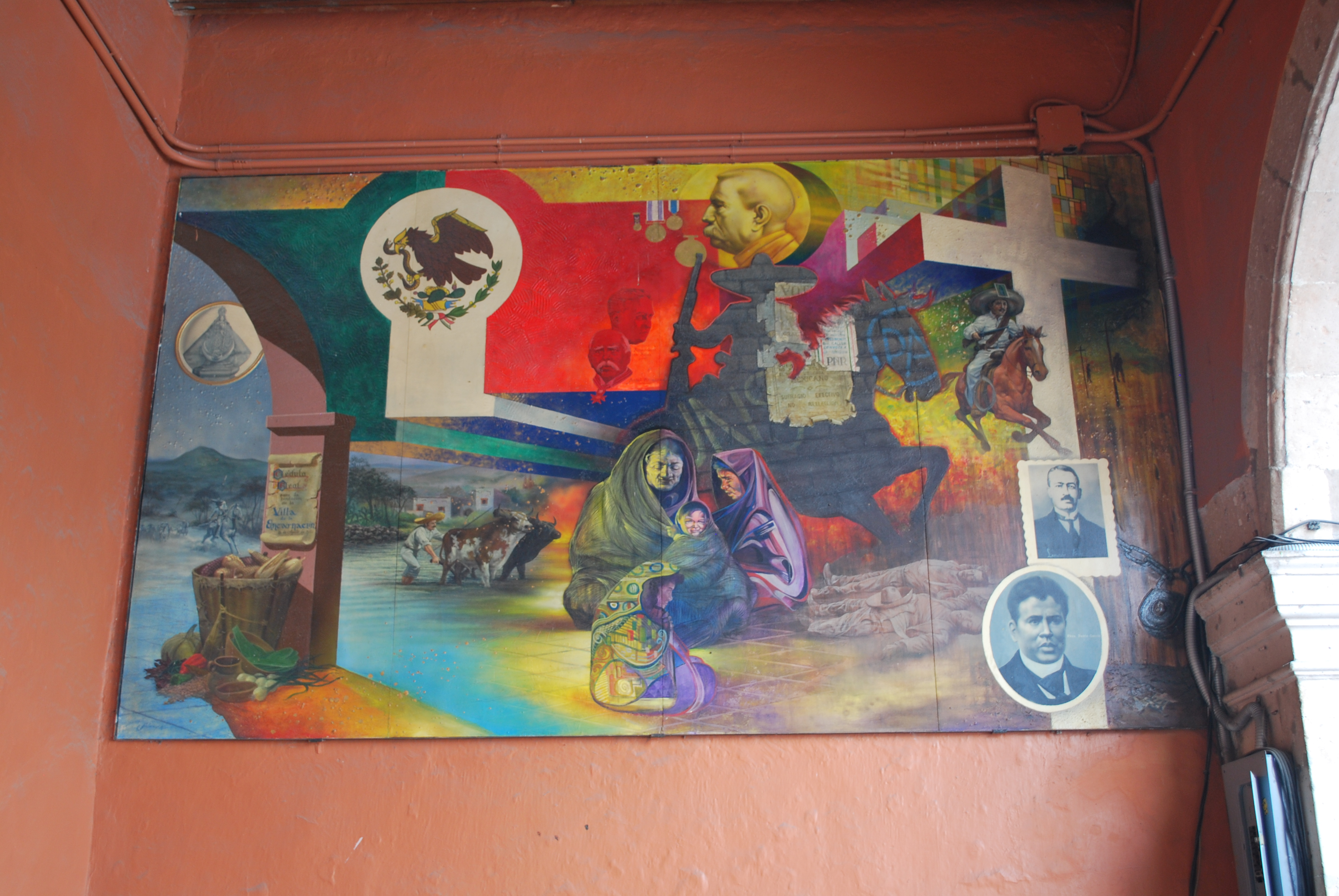
Mural at the municipal palace dedicated to the Cristero War

The full name of Encarnación de Díaz comes from two distinct sets of circumstances. "Encarnación" refers to a small image of the Virgin Mary, called "Nuestra Señora de la Encarnación" (Our Lady of the Incarnation), which is said to have been found by a worker at the San Miguel Hacienda. When a town was founded on this property in 1760, it was originally called Villa de Nuestra Señora de la Encarnación de Los Macías. Over time, the named shortened and in 1879, the name was officially changed to Encarnación de Díaz. "de Díaz" was added in honor of Porfirio Díaz, president of México at the time, who fought against the French Intervention in Mexico. The coat of arms of the municipality was designed by historian Alejandro Topete del Valle and Professor Manuel Iván Zenteno Díaz and approved in 1965. The nickname of the municipality is La Chona with people born here denominated as Chonense.

Although archaeological finds show mammoth bones and Cenozoic period plant fossils, human habitation in the area is dated to about 15,000 years ago, mostly nomads passing through. The first semi-settled peoples in the municipality area are called the Huachichiles, a hunter-gatherer group who lived between 150 and 200 Ce and were subject to a dominion based in Teocaltech. From then on, various archeological sites show the area with pre Hispanic settlements until the 16th century. The largest of these sites is El Tule in the southwest of the municipality near the Montecillo spring. This settlement was linked to Teocaltiche, occupied by Tecuexes and later by the Cascais. It has similarities to a site at Cerro del Tuiche in Nochistlán, Zacatecas. Tepozan de Miranda is a site near the community of the same name. This site is connected to a group of semi-nomadic Chichimecas. However, because this area was part of a natural pass connecting lands north and south, it remained a heavily travelled corridor by peoples such as the Tecuexes, Guachichiles, Zacatecas and Caxcans, who were semi nomadic. The pass was also used by northern Chichimeca groups to raid the more sedentary cultures in the south.

The Spanish began their conquest of the area in 1529. When it was completed, larger permanent settlements became possible. During the colonial period, two factors shaped the settlement and economic development of the area. The first was the pass to the north, which came to be known as the Puerta del Oro (The Gate of Gold). The Spanish built a road through here called the Camino de las Carretas linking Nueva Galicia to the mines and other lands to the north. This road would eventually connect Mexico City to Santa Fe. This road carried ore south to processing area in Michoacán and carried food and other supplies north to these same mines. This road gave rise to the first Spanish settlement in the area in 1567, then called Sauz de Los Macias. It functioned as a way station between Villas de Santa Maria de Los Lagos and Aguascalientes as it had a freshwater spring. In addition to the road, demands for supplies from northern mines prompted the establishment of various haciendas in the municipality area to produce crops and livestock. Major colonial-era haciendas include Hacienda de San José de los Sauces, titled in 1567 but refounded at the end of the 17th century, Hacienda del Tacuán, given to Pedro Mateo de Ortega at the end of the 16th century, Hacienda de Santa Bárbara from the 16th century, Mariquita Hacienda established in 1563 and Casas Blancas in 1580.

The town of Encarnación has its origins in a way station set up for travelers on the north-south road through the pass. The station was established in the San Miguel Hacienda in 1694 and called the Puesto del Sauz de Los Macías where there was a spring with potable water. In the 18th century, the area's population had grown sufficiently that it needed a center of civil and religious services. The way station was declared a village in 1760 under the name of Villa de Nuestra Señora de la Encarnación de Los Macías. The name partly came from a small image of the Virgin Mary which was found by a worker at the San Miguel Hacienda.

During the Mexican War of Independence, insurgents defended the town at the Cerro del Baluarte in 1811. Later that same year, Miguel Hidalgo passed through on his way north after his defeat at Puente de Calderón.

By 1823, the town was an official seat of government for the area. For much of the 19th century, however, it was a dependency of either San Juan de los Lagos or of Teocaltiche. In 1872, it became an independent Department. The municipal archives began functioning in 1867, but the municipality was not officially recognized until 1917.

The town reached its economic height during the Porfirio Díaz period, being recognized as a city by state authorities in 1879 with the new name of Encarnación de Díaz. The town and area's prosperity relied on the many successful haciendas, making the region a primary supplier of foodstuffs and raw materials. However, during the early 20th century, changes in travel patterns and the Mexican Revolution led to the economic decline of the area. In the 1920s, the area became a centre of rebellion during the Cristero War, partly because of the economic situation. The rebellion forced the government to station troops here to protect the rail station. Most of the fighting was guerilla warfare with the rebels receiving supplies clandestinely from the local populace.

== Economy ==
Historically, the economy has been based on agriculture and catering to travelers. Today, agriculture remains a mainstay of the economy, with some tourism.

Most of the land of the municipality is used as pasture for livestock with some cropland. Most of the agricultural land is held communally in ejidos. Main crops include corn, beans, oats and vegetables such as onions and chilli peppers. Livestock includes cattle, pigs, sheep, goats, domestic fowl, bees and horses. This is the primary economic activity utilizing 68% of the municipality's surface. Some areas contain poplars, mesquite and huisache are commercially important for lumber. Agriculture and forestry provide over 43% of the municipality's jobs.

Main industries include ceramics and textiles, especially clothing. There is some mining, principally of sandstone. Manufacturing in the area is growing as the municipality is connected to Mexico's central industrial corridor. This sector employs about 28% of the population.

Important handcrafts include embroidered clothing, especially blouses and quezquemetls, as well as other textiles such as tablecloths, napkins and pillows. Woven items include scrapes in various colours and designs. In general, women embroider and men weave. The oldest produced craft in the area is ceramics, followed by textiles, both having their origins in the pre-Hispanic period. Ceramics date to between 150 and 200 CE. The arrival of the Spanish changed techniques considerably and today the most common styles are barro bruñido and a style called Loza de Fuego, which is fired twice.

The Spanish introduced ironworking to the area, which became important due to the area's proximity to mining areas, producing tools for both mining and agriculture. Some silverwork is also done as well, mostly limited to the community of El Arenal. Another important craft is glass items, including stained glass windows and ceramics. It is a new craft for the area, having been introduced in 1943, by residents arriving from Zamora. In 1976, a new technique was introduced which allowed for a type of glass filigree work.

Most commerce and services in the municipality are dedicated to local, primary needs. There is some tourism to the municipality with attractions such as the resort El Sauzal Hacienda, El Montecillo hot springs, the cultural centre and municipal library. Tourism infrastructure consists of four hotels, ten restaurants, a bus terminal, three banks and two gas stations. This employs about a quarter of the population.

== Transportation ==
The municipality area continues to be a major transit point. The main road through the area is Highway 45, which connects Mexico City with Ciudad Juárez. Another major road, which intersects this one is the Tampico- Barra de Navidad highway as well as the Encarnación de Díaz-San Sebastián del Alamo-San Juan de Los Lagos and León-Aguascalientes highways. The rail line built in 1883 still connects Mexico City and Ciudad Juárez, but the municipality is no longer a stop. There are intra and interstate bus service with a bus station on the main highway. The nearest airport is 28 km away in Aguascalientes.
