= Dean Wright =

American film director

- Born: May 15, 1962 (age 64); Michigan, U.S.
- Occupations: Visual Effects Supervisor, filmmaker

Dean Wright (born May 15, 1962) is a film director and visual effects supervisor, best known for his work on The Lord of the Rings film trilogy and The Chronicles of Narnia: The Lion, the Witch and the Wardrobe.

== Biography ==
Michigan-born Wright enrolled at the University of Arizona film school to pursue a career as a filmmaker. Relocating to Los Angeles in 1989, he landed work with one of the industry's most prominent directors, James Cameron, on the groundbreaking project Terminator 2: Judgment Day. The film's success propelled Wright into larger production rolls in a variety of capacities alongside acclaimed filmmakers.

He became the VFX production manager for Cameron's own visual effect's house, Digital Domain. Collaborating with effects supervisor Rob Legato, Wright worked on Titanic. The film garnered eleven Academy Awards, including the Oscar for Best Visual Effects. Wright was promoted to visual effects producer and helped land Digital Domain's next landmark project, What Dreams May Come, which also earned the Academy Award for Best Visual Effects.

After producing the VFX for several other projects, he joined Dream Quest Images. During his tenure he was responsible for the production of all VFX at the facility, overseeing more than thirty feature films, theme park attractions and animation projects, including Reign of Fire, 102 Dalmatians, Mission to Mars, Inspector Gadget, Oscar-nominated Mighty Joe Young, Unbreakable, The Sixth Sense and Bicentennial Man.

In 2002, Wright became visual effects producer for the final two chapters in The Lord of the Rings film trilogy. In undertaking this challenge, he teamed with Oscar-winning VFX supervisor Jim Rygiel. In 2003 The Lord of the Rings: The Two Towers was recognized with eight Visual Effects Society awards, as well as both the BAFTA and the Academy Award for Visual Effects. The Lord of the Rings: The Return of the King won in all of the eleven Oscar categories in which it was nominated, including Best Picture, Director, and Visual Effects. Wright picked up the top Visual Effects Society award for his work on the project.

Wright was the visual effects supervisor for Andrew Adamson's The Chronicles of Narnia: The Lion, the Witch and the Wardrobe, and was nominated for an Academy Award, BAFTA Award and VES Award for Best Visual Effects for 2005. He was also the Visual Effects Supervisor for the Narnia follow up, Prince Caspian. In 2008, Wright began preparing for his directorial debut on the big budget VFX bible epic, Kingdom Come, but when the film's start of production was delayed, Wright was hired to rewrite and direct what was to become the largest ever Mexican produced feature film, Cristiada (also titled For Greater Glory), starring Andy Garcia, Peter O'Toole and Eva Longoria. The film was released June 1, 2012 by 20th Century Fox.

Wright would join MGM as a visual effects executive for film and television. He would oversee projects such as Vikings, Fargo and No Time to Die.

== Select filmography ==
- Cristiada (2012) .... Director, Writer
- The Chronicles of Narnia: Prince Caspian (2008) .... Visual Effects Supervisor
- The Chronicles of Narnia: The Lion, the Witch and the Wardrobe (2005) .... Visual Effects Supervisor
- The Lord of the Rings: The Return of the King (2003) .... Visual Effects Producer
- The Lord of the Rings: The Two Towers (2002) .... Visual Effects Producer
- Reign of Fire (2002) .... Visual Effects Executive Producer
- Unbreakable (2000) .... Visual Effects Executive Producer
- Gone in 60 Seconds (2000) .... Visual Effects Executive Producer
- Bicentennial Man (1999) .... Visual Effects Executive Producer
- What Dreams May Come (1998) .... Visual Effects Producer
- Titanic (1997) .... Visual Effects Production Manager
