= Pablo Jose Barroso =

Mexican film producer

Pablo Jose Barroso is a Mexican film producer, known for his work in creating Catholic-themed films.

== Filmography ==
- Guadalupe (2006)
- Hacia la vida (short, 2009)
- Treasure Hunters (2011)
- The Greatest Miracle (2011)
- For Greater Glory (2012)
- Max & Me (upcoming)
