= Cristero Museum =

History museum in Jalisco, Mexico

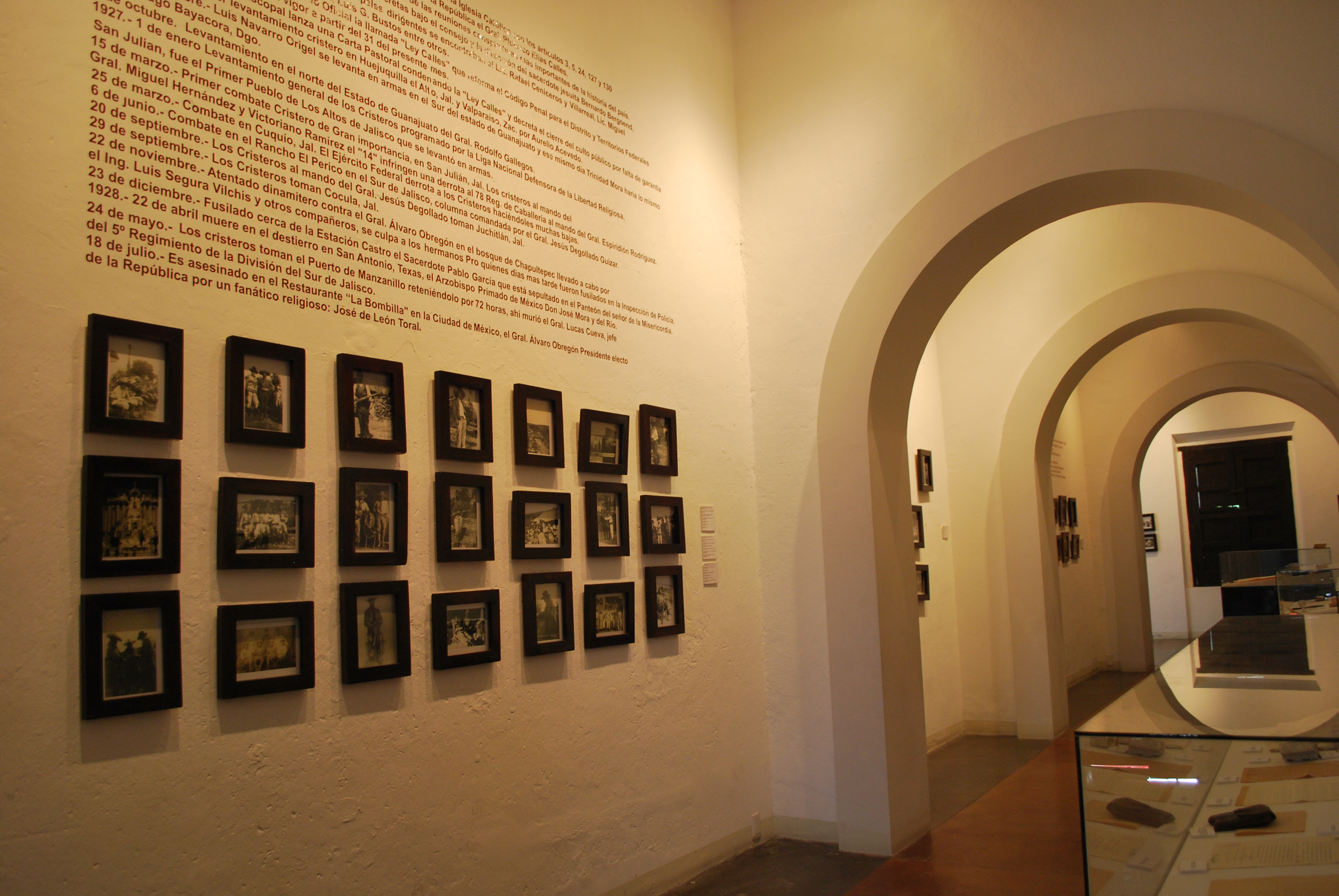
- Hallway inside the museum (2011)
- Former name: Efrén Quesada Ibarra Cristero Museum
- Established: 20 May 2006 (re-opened; originally 1978)
- Location: Encarnación de Diaz, Jalisco, Mexico
- Coordinates: 21.5278°N 102.2396°W
- Type: History museum of the Cristero War
- Founder: Alfredo Hernández Quesada

Cristero Museum (Spanish: Museo Cristero), also referred to as the Alfredo Hernández Quesada Cristero Studies Center, is a museum in Encarnación de Diaz, Jalisco, Mexico. The museum is dedicated to the history of the Cristero War, a 1926–1929 armed conflict between the federal government and Catholic rebels opposing the enforcement of anti-clerical laws. It houses video interviews, artifacts, and photographs related to individuals who participated in the armed conflict. The museum is administered by the Municipality of Encarnación de Díaz and is situated along the Camino Real de Tierra Adentro, a UNESCO World Heritage site.

== History ==
The museum, located in Encarnación de Díaz, Jalisco, Mexico, was originally founded in 1978 under the name Cristero Museum Efrén Quesada Ibarra, in honor of Efrén Quesada Ibarra, one of the captains in the Cristero War. During the 1980s and early 1990s, his nephew, Alfredo Hernández Quesada, sought out individuals who had participated in the conflict and recorded numerous video interviews documenting their accounts. Several interviewees also donated artifacts to him, contributing to the growth of the collection. Hernández Quesada stated that the initial effort to assemble the collection begun years earlier under his uncle's initiative. Much of the collection was donated by his uncle, as well as by Heriberto Navarrete, Luis Rivero del Val, and José Gutiérrez Gutiérrez, in addition to artifacts gathered by Hernández Quesada himself.

The museum was formally inaugurated in February 1995 and opened a public exhibition space in 1997. Hernández Quesada, who was a member of the Cristera National Guard, an offshoot of the original Cristero War movement, continued expanding the collection. In 2003, Hernández Quesada's collection was transferred to the government of Aguascalientes for the establishment of the Museo Nacional de la Cristiada (also known as Museo de la Cristiada). The collection had previously been offered for sale, and proposals were made to relocate it to Guadalajara, Jalisco, or to the University of California, Berkeley. However, Hernández Quesada preferred Aguascalientes due to family ties and its relative proximity. During the first year, he agreed to loan the collection without charge, on the condition that the government cover operational expenses, pay the museum employees’ salaries, and permit him to sell his books at the new location. After this initial loan period, the government of Aguascalientes completed the purchase of the collection for MXN$8 million. Hernández Quesada died in 2004, 15 days after receiving the payment. The museum closed in 2005 due to low visitor attendance and inadequate archival facilities.

In 2005, the museum reopened in Encarnación de Díaz and inaugurated a studies center named the Alfredo Hernández Quesada Cristero Studies Center, in honor of Hernández Quesada, who had died two years earlier. The expansion involved an investment of MXN$1 million from the Municipality of Encarnación de Díaz and near MXN$300,000 from Jalisco's Secretariat of Culture. Additional materials were incorporated with the aim of presenting a more balanced account of the Cristero War, addressing both the Catholic rebels and the Mexican federal government. After the collection was returned to Encarnación de Díaz, complaints were filed against Aguascalientes Governor Luis Armando Reynoso Femat, alleging that several items from Hernández Quesada's collection that had been temporarily transferred to Aguascalientes for the establishment of the new museum had not been returned and were missing. Estimates placed the number of items missing at 3,000.

In 2017, the Municipality of Encarnación de Díaz approved the demolition of the museum to make way for a town square. The Jalisco Secretariat of Culture intervened, stating that the building was located along the Camino Real de Tierra Adentro, a UNESCO-designated historic site, and that the municipality lacked the authority to authorize its demolition.

The museum is managed by the Municipality of Encarnación de Diaz.

== Collections ==
The museum houses collections related to the Cristero War, a 1926–1929 armed conflict in Mexico between the federal government under President Plutarco Elías Calles and Catholic rebels who opposed the enforcement of anti-clerical laws.

Its collection includes approximately 120 artifacts, 350 historical documents, and 240 hours of recorded material. The interviews conducted by Hernández Quesada include former Cristero members, soldiers of the federal army, agrarian activists, priests, politicians, and historians. The museum also maintains an archive library containing newspapers, books, and other resources related to the Cristero War. This library is open to the public, and the government has undertaken efforts to catalog, organize, and digitize its holdings. These materials have served as sources for publications such as La Cristiada (Editorial Clío) and Voces de la Cristiada (Secretaría de Cultura, 1996), as well as for three documentary films directed by Enrique Krauze. The collection has also supported research projects at universities in Chicago, California, and Texas.

The exhibition galleries display photographs of key figures, early documents, and personal items belonging to participants in the conflict, along with a chronological account of the Cristero War. Notable artifacts include the Primer Regimento flag, originally raised in Huejuquilla on 26 August 1926 during an armed revolt, and a vest once owned by Anacleto González Flores, a senior leader of the Cristero movement.

In 2017, approximately 200 artifacts from the museum were exhibited in Dallas, Texas, at Casa Guanajuato, a cultural center for Mexican studies, and at the Nuestra Señora Pilar Catholic Parish. In 2019, part of Hernández Quesada's collection that had been acquired by the government of Aguascalientes was transferred to a state facility that preserved archives and artifacts in climate-controlled vaults.
