= Krishna Riboud =

Indian researcher and historian (1926–2000)

- Born: Krishna Roy; 12 October 1926; Dhaka, Bengal Presidency, British India
- Died: 27 June 2000 (aged 73); Paris, France
- Education: Wellesley College
- Spouse: Jean Riboud (m. 1949; died 1985)
- Children: Christophe Riboud
- Parents: Rajendra Roy (father); Ena Tagore Roy (mother)
- Relatives: Grand children : Penelope, Thomas, Raphaella
- Family: Tagore family

Krishna Riboud (née Roy; 12 October 1926 – 27 June 2000) was an Indian historian and art collector, specializing in Indian and Chinese antiquities and textiles.

Riboud began her textile collection in the 1950s, when she started purchasing Baluchari saris from Bengal,. She was a member of the jury of the 1958 Cannes Film Festival.

== Early life and education ==
Roy was born on 12 October 1926 in Dhaka, the daughter of Rajendra Roy, director of public health in East Bengal and Ena Tagore Roy. Her mother was a grandniece of Rabindranath Tagore. Her father died, when Roy was ten years old, and she was raised by her maternal uncle Soumendranath Tagore in Calcutta. Her uncle was influential in her life. In 1983, she told The New Yorker, "My uncle, whom I had a passion for, was a revolutionary Marxist, and his Marxism was very different from the Communism we know now." She also recalled witnessing her uncle being arrested by British police and forced on to a train at Calcutta railway station.

While on a visit to India, Lois Kellogg, daughter of Spencer Kellogg, Jr., the scion of a wealthy American family, fell ill and received treatment from Roy's father Rajendra. Spencer Kellogg, Jr. later helped secure the release of Soumendranath Tagore from prison. After returning to the United States, Lois Kellogg wrote a letter to Ena Tagore, requesting her to enroll her daughter at Wellesley College. Lois Kellogg also offered to serve as Krishna's guardian, and offered to let her spend her winter vacations at the Kelloggs' home in Scottsdale, Arizona, and weekends at their home in Connecticut. With her mother's permission, Krishna Roy left for Wellesley College in 1943. She received letters of introduction to John Dewey and Albert Einstein, both of whom knew her uncles. Krishna Roy visited John Dewey, who requested her not to study Western philosophy. She also visited Einstein at his home in Princeton.

== Later life ==
Roy attended a party for French photographer Henri Cartier-Bresson given by the editor of Harper's Bazaar in the spring of 1947. At the party, she met the chairman of Schlumberger, Jean Riboud. Riboud would later describe her as "one of three absolutely adorable, beautiful young Indian girls who were visiting from Wellesley College". Recalling the meeting, Roy later stated that Riboud had made "no impression whatsoever". After their first meeting, Riboud invited Roy to take a walk during which he asked about her uncles, and they discussed India, her philosophy studies, and modern art. He also asked her to join him and his sister Françoise, on a trip around the United States. Roy agreed, and in the summer of 1949, the three traveled by car to Seattle, along the Pacific Coast to Arizona, and across the country to the home of American poet and critic Charles Olson at Black Mountain College.

Roy and Riboud decided to get married in 1949. Ena Tagore Roy wanted her daughter to marry an Indian, and Riboud's mother Hélène wanted her son to marry a Catholic. At Françoise's suggestion, the couple wrote to their mothers informing them of the wedding, but chose not to wait for their replies. Roy and Riboud married on 1 October 1949 at the Kelloggs' house in Connecticut. Françoise served as matron of honor, Charles Olson served as best man, and Roy was attended by her friend Rita Pandit. Their only son Christophe was born in 1950 in New York.

It is reported that the couple had an extensive friendship circle which included political figures like François Mitterrand, Indira Gandhi and Ne Win and art personalities, such as Yves Tanguy, Henri Cartier-Bresson, Isamu Noguchi, M. F. Hussain, Joan Miró and Max Ernst. They also had an art collection, part of which was later donated by Krishna Ribaud to the Musée Guimet, where a separate gallery of the Jean and Krishna Riboud collection is being maintained.

Jean Riboud died in Paris in October 1986, and their only son Christophe died in a car accident in France in August 1988. Over the next decade, Krishna divided her time between France and India. Krishna Riboud died at her home in Paris, France, on 27 June 2000.

== Selected publications ==
Books

- (ed.) In Quest of Themes and Skills: Asian Textiles (Bombay: Marg Publications, 1989.
- (ed.) Traditional Costumes and Textiles of Japan (AEDTA exhibitions of Japanese textiles)
- (ed.) Samit and Lampas: Indian Motifs (Ahmedabad: Calico Museum, 1998)
- (co-ed.) The Fabric of India (V&A Publishing, 2015)

Articles

- “A Closer View of Early Chinese Silks”, in Studies in Textile History in Memory of Harold B. Burnham, ed. Veronika Gervers (Toronto: Royal Ontario Museum, 1977), pp. 252–280.
- “References to Textiles in Bana’s Harshacharita”, Journal of Indian Textile History (n.d.)
- “Studies in Indo-European Textile History” (1966)
- "A Reappraisal of Han Dynasty Monochrome Figured Silks", Bulletin de Liaison, CIETA 38 (1973)
- "A Survey of Votive and Ritual Textiles from the Han to T'ang Dynasty", Proceedings, 5th ISCRCP, Interregional Influences in East Asian Art History (1982)
- "Découvertes récentes de soieries en Chine: Dynasties des Royaumes Combattants et des Han", Les Routes de la Soie: patrimoine commun, identités plurielles. Editions UNESCO 1994, pp.21-34.
- "Deux documents écrits sur soie datant de la dynastie Han", Histoire et Cultes de L'Asie Centrale Préislamique (Paris, Editions de CNRS, 1991)
- "Further Indication of Changing Techniques in Figured Silks of the Post-Han Period (AD 4th to 8th century)", Bulletin du CIETA (Lyon: Centre International d'étude des Textiles Anciens, 1975, no 41-42, pp. 13-40, with illustrations.
- Some remarks on the face-covers (fu-mien) discovered in the tombs of Astana", Oriental Art, New Series, Vol. 23, No. 4 (1977): pp. 438–454.
- "Pratiques funéraires dans les nécropoles d'Astana", Cultes et monuments religieux dans l'Asie Centrale preislamique (Paris: Editions de CNRS, 1987)

AEDTA publications initiated or edited by Krishna Riboud
These were often collaborative catalogues:

- AEDTA Bibliography
- Chinese Costume and Accessories: 17th–20th Century
- Le motif floral dans les tissus moghols : Inde
- Les tiraz et tissus proto-islamiques de la collection de l’AEDTA
- Motifs indiens
- Phulkari : fleurs brodées du Punjab
- Aspects of the KashmirshawlQuelques aspects du châle cachemire
- Portfolio AEDTA
