= Valerian Rybar =

American interior designer (1919–1990)

- Born: Valerian Stux Rybar; 17 June 1919; Sarajevo, Yugoslavia (now Bosnia and Herzegovina)
- Died: 9 June 1990 (aged 70)
- Occupation: Interior designer
- Known for: "World's most expensive decorator"
- Spouse: Aileen Guinness (1956–1965)
- Partner: Jean-Francois Daigre

Valerian Stux Rybar (or Stux-Rybar; 17 June 1919 – 9 June 1990) was an American interior designer, called the "world's most expensive decorator" in 1972, and known for his opulent and extravagant taste.

== Early life ==
Rybar was born on 17 June 1919, in Sarajevo, Yugoslavia. His father, Geza Stux-Rybar, a Hungarian banker, had a jacket with a bullet hole, as he had been a guest at a reception for Archduke Franz Ferdinand when he was assassinated in 1914. His mother, Vilma von Kalman (1892–1974), was "Viennese", although she was born in Urmin. He was educated in Vienna, followed by two years at law school in Sweden before the Second World War, where he served in Dubrovnik. He then moved to New York, travelling on a Swedish passport.

== Career ==
Rybar started his career as a trainee at New York's Lord & Taylor department store, but soon was taken on by Elizabeth Arden to design shop interiors, after Arden saw a headdress he had designed for an opera singer.

His clients included Nicholas DuPont, Samuel Newhouse, Pierre Schlumberger, Christina Onassis, Stavros Niarchos, Guy and Marie-Hélène de Rothschild, Delmonico’s Roman Room and New York's Plaza Hotel. His commercial projects included "exotic gourmet restaurants" in Las Vegas and redesigning hotels in New York. Rybar personally designed much of the furniture and rugs used in his projects, "chose such opulent fabrics as satins trimmed with gold thread or red velvet", and employed artisans worldwide.

Rybar spent 18 months designing a ball for Antenor Patiño and 1,000 of his friends, that was called "the most important since World War II and perhaps the luxury party of the century."

In 1972, he was called the "world's most expensive decorator". Together with Jean-Francois Daigre, he founded the Valerian Rybar & Daigre Design Corporation of New York and Paris. The use of mirrors and steel were regarded as part of his "signature" style.

In September 2007, Christie's hosted an auction in New York entitled "European Furniture, Sculpture, Works of Art and Tapestries Including A San Francisco Apartment Designed By Valerian Rybar And Jean- François Daigre", which realised a total of $3.9 million.

== Personal life ==
On 19 December 1956, Rybar married Aileen Plunket née Guinness, one of the "Guinness Golden Girls". They lived on the 570-acre Luttrellstown Castle estate near Dublin, Ireland, and "set about trying to re-create the thirties" with lavish parties and guests including the Duchess of Windsor. They separated in 1965, as Rybar had become "an extravagance even she could not afford".

Rybar later lived with his long-term partner Jean-Francois Daigre. Daigre died in a Paris hospital in 1992, aged 56, of an AIDS-related illness.

Rybar's six-room apartment in Sutton Place, Manhattan was known for its extravagant design in just three colours, coral, brown, and silver. The dining room was lined with 400 fake books, all with titles relating to episodes in his life, and the one entitled International Boredom allegedly alluded to his marriage to Guinness. The walls of the hall and living room were covered in coral velvet, and everything was custom made including a silver-gray mink rug by Oscar de la Renta.

In 1977, The Washington Post reported that Rybar's dressing room was "fanatically neat" and included 150 shirts, 40 seasonal suits (all beige), 100 belts, and "a steel banquette covered in handpainted ponyskin that goes up and down electrically and can be a massage table, an ironing board or a place for packing." According to The Washington Post, "If Valerian Rybar did not exist, he could never have been invented."

Rybar died from prostate cancer at his home in Sutton Place, Manhattan, on 9 June 1990.
