= Jean Riboud =

French socialist and corporate executive (1919–1985)

- Born: 15 November 1919; Lyon, France
- Died: 20 October 1985 (aged 65); Neuilly-sur-Seine, France
- Occupations: Corporate executive Socialist
- Years active: 1939–1985
- Known for: Schlumberger
- Spouse: Krishna Roy
- Children: Christophe
- Awards: Padma Bhushan

Jean Riboud (15 November 1919 – 20 October 1985) was a French socialist and corporate executive. He was the chairman of Schlumberger, the largest oilfield services company in the world. He was a member of the French Resistance during World War II and suffered incarceration in Buchenwald concentration camp of the Nazis. His contributions were reported in making Schlumberger into the market leader in oilfield services sector. The Government of India awarded him the third highest civilian honour of the Padma Bhushan, in 1986, for his contributions to society.

== Biography ==
If you want to innovate, to change an enterprise or a society, it takes people willing to do what's not expected

— Jean Riboud.

Riboud, born on 15 November 1919 in the French city of Lyon to a banker, graduated from the École des Sciences Politiques, Paris in 1939. He was involved with politics from his student years and was a supporter of the Popular Front coalition government of Leon Blum. Later, he started his career as a lieutenant in the French Army and after serving the army for a while, he joined the French Resistance. It was during this period he was captured by the Nazis and was sent to Buchenwald concentration camp where spent two years, suffering from tuberculosis, before escaping from there with help from the communists. When the war ended, he pursued a career in banking by joining Andre Istel and Company, a private investment banking firm owned by a friend of his father, and this gave him an opportunity to visit United States in 1946 for opening an office of his bank in New York. There, he met Marcel Schlumberger, one of the founders of the Schlumberger group, and on his invitation, Riboud joined Schlumberger as the founder's assistant in 1951. He continued in the company even after the death of Marcel Schlumberger in 1953 and rose in ranks to become the head of Europe operations and later, as the chief executive of the company in 1965. Seven years later, he became the chairman of the group, in 1972.

Under his leadership, Schlumberger grew to become the largest oilfield services company in the world with interests in other sectors such as semiconductors. He expanded the company business by acquisitions, too; the taking over of Fairchild Camera and Instrument was one such acquisition. By the time he relinquished his position to his successor, Michel Vaillaud, in 1985, the company had a net profit of US$I.2 billion on a revenue of US$6.4 billion and had presence in over 100 countries, controlling the operations of 70 percent of the world's oil wells. At that time, the company employed 80,000 people, held US$10.9 billion in assets and was considered by many as the best managed company in the world.

Riboud married Krishna Roy, historian, art collector, the great-grandniece of Rabindranath Tagore, niece of Soumendranath Tagore, and the great-granddaughter of Dwijendranath Tagore, in 1949, and the couple had a son, Christophe. It is reported that the Riboud couple had an extensive friendship circle, which included political figures like François Mitterrand, Indira Gandhi and Ne Win and art personalities such as Yves Tanguy, Henri Cartier-Bresson, Isamu Noguchi, M. F. Hussain, Joan Miró and Max Ernst. They also had an art collection, parts of which were later donated by Krishna Riboud to the Musee Guimet. where a separate gallery of the Jean and Krishna Riboud collection is being maintained. Towards the later days of his life, he was afflicted with cancer and handed over his responsibilities to Vaillaud in September 1985. A month later, on 20 October 1985, he died at his Neuilly-sur-Seine home, survived by his wife, son and three grandchildren. The Government of India honored him with the civilian award of the Padma Bhushan in 1986. The story of his life has been documented in the book The Art of Corporate Success: The Story of Schlumberger, written by Ken Auletta, as well as in his autobiography, Jean Riboud, published in 1989.

== See also ==
- Guimet Museum, Paris
