= Heriberto Navarrete Flores =

Heriberto Navarrete Flores S.J.
- Born: March 16, 1903; Etzatlán, Jalisco, Mexico
- Died: August 21, 1987 (aged 84); Guadalajara, Jalisco, Mexico
- Occupation: Priest
- Known for: Cristero War rebel
- Religion: Roman Catholic

Heriberto Navarrete Flores (16 March 1903 – 21 August 1987) was a Jesuit priest. He fought in the Cristero War before being ordained as a priest and is author of the memoirs Por Dios y Por La Patria.

== Biography ==
Navarrete Flores was born in Etzatlán, Jalisco, on March 16, 1903. From 1910, he lived in Guadalajara. He entered the ACJM (Asociación Católica de la Juventud Mexicana) in 1920, where he became a close friend of Anacleto González Flores, who was later beatified by the Catholic Church.

He became General Secretary of the "U" (Unión Popular en Jalisco), and was made prisoner on April 2, 1927, and deported to the Islas Marías until late July of that year. He joined the ranks of the Catholic rebels in September 1927 and was assistant to General Enrique Gorostieta Velarde. On 1929 he returned to civilian life in Mexico City, counselled by a general from Guadalajara who warned him that to stay there would mean being executed in revenge by the government of Plutarco Elías Calles. On October 2, 1933, he entered the Compañía de Jesús and took vows on October 3, 1935.

Navarrete was headmaster of the Escuela Carlos Pereyra, a Jesuit school in Torreón, Coahuila, from 1954 to 1960. He died in Guadalajara in 1987.
