= José de León Toral =

Assassin of Mexican president Álvaro Obregón

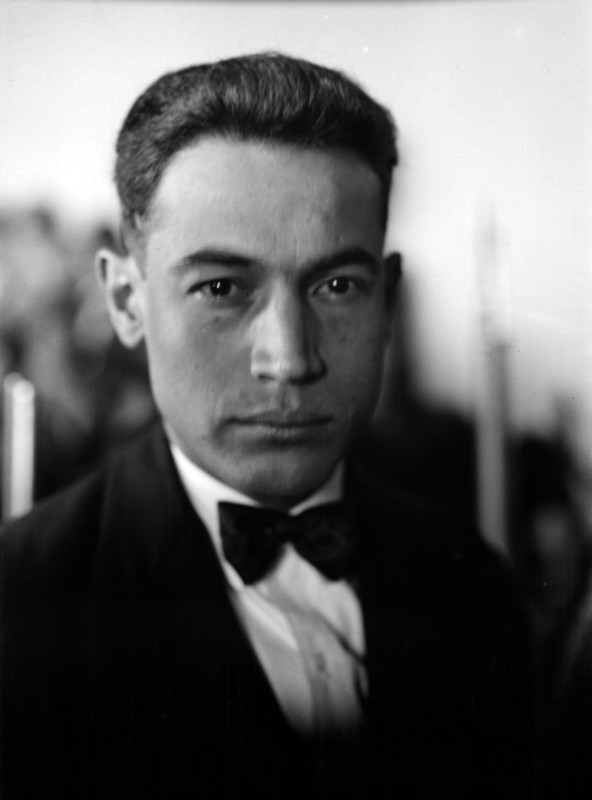
- De León Toral in 1928
- Born: December 23, 1900; Matehuala, San Luis Potosí
- Died: February 9, 1929 (aged 28); Mexico City, Mexico
- Occupation: Illustrator
- Known for: Assassinating Álvaro Obregón
- Status: Executed by firing squad
- Conviction: Murder
- Penalty: Death

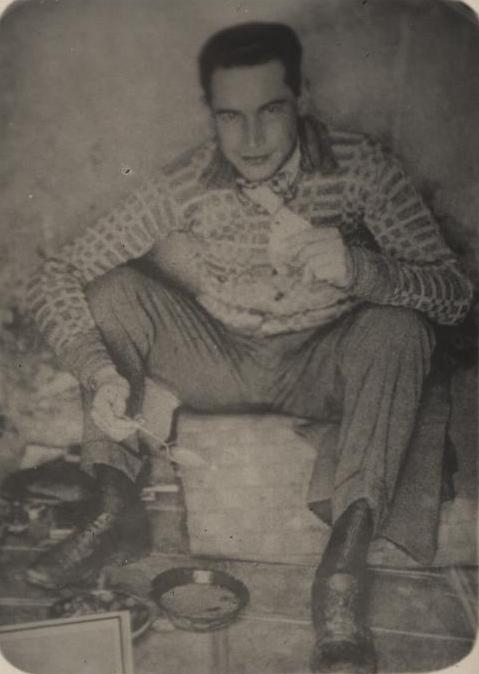
José de León Toral in prison during his trial

José de León Toral (December 23, 1900 – February 9, 1929) was a Mexican illustrator who assassinated General Álvaro Obregón, former president and president-elect of Mexico, in 1928.

== Early life ==
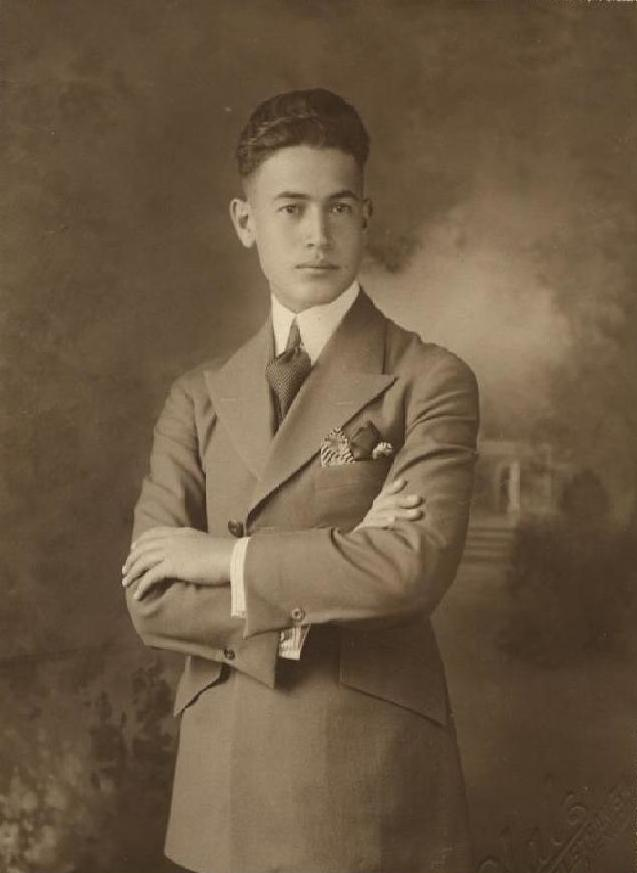
De León Toral in his youth

De León Toral was born in Matehuala, San Luis Potosí, into a family of Catholic miners. He moved to Mexico City during the Mexican Revolution and witnessed General Obregón closing churches and arresting priests who were suspected of supporting former president Victoriano Huerta. In 1920, he joined the National League for the Defense of Religious Liberty, which opposed the governments of Obregón (1920–1924) and Plutarco Elías Calles, and he reportedly was also involved in the Cristero War.

== Background ==
During the Calles administration, religious persecution of the Catholic Church in Mexico greatly expanded in 1926 under the Calles Law, which provided for the execution of priests and other individuals who violated provisions of the 1917 Constitution. Wearing clerical garb in public outside church buildings was punishable by a fine of 500 pesos, then approximately US$250. A priest who criticized the government could be imprisoned for five years with no right to trial by jury.

Some states enacted even more oppressive measures. Chihuahua enacted a law permitting only a single priest to serve all of the state's Catholics. To help enforce the law, Calles seized church property; expelled all foreign priests; and closed the monasteries, convents, and religious schools.

Obregón had been more lenient to Catholics during his time in office, but it was widely believed that Calles was merely his puppet leader. In 1927, two of De León Toral's friends, Frs. Humberto and Miguel Pro, were executed after they had falsely been accused of plotting to assassinate Obregón. Allegedly incited by a Catholic nun, Concepción Acevedo de la Llata, also known as 'Madre Conchita' or Mother Conchita, he decided to assassinate Obregón, whom he blamed for the government's persecution against Catholics.

=== Assassination ===
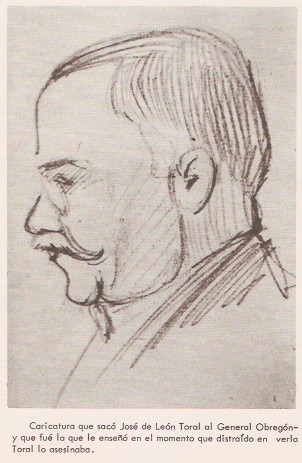
One of Toral sketches

On 17 July 1928, two weeks after Obregón had been re-elected as president, De León Toral, a sketch artist, entered La Bombilla restaurant in San Ángel, where a party honoring Obregón was under way. Disguised as a caricaturist, he drew caricatures of Obregón, the orchestra director, and Aarón Sáenz, and showed them to Obregón, who told him the caricatures were well done and suggested that he should continue. When Obregón turned to sit down, De León Toral drew a gun and shot him five or six times in the back, killing him instantly.

De León Toral was arrested immediately and pleaded guilty, claiming that he killed Obregón to facilitate the establishment of the Kingdom of Christ. Mother Conchita was also arrested and received a 20-year prison sentence but was pardoned after serving 13 years; she eventually married Carlos Castro Balda, a bomber of the Mexican Chamber of Deputies.

=== Execution ===
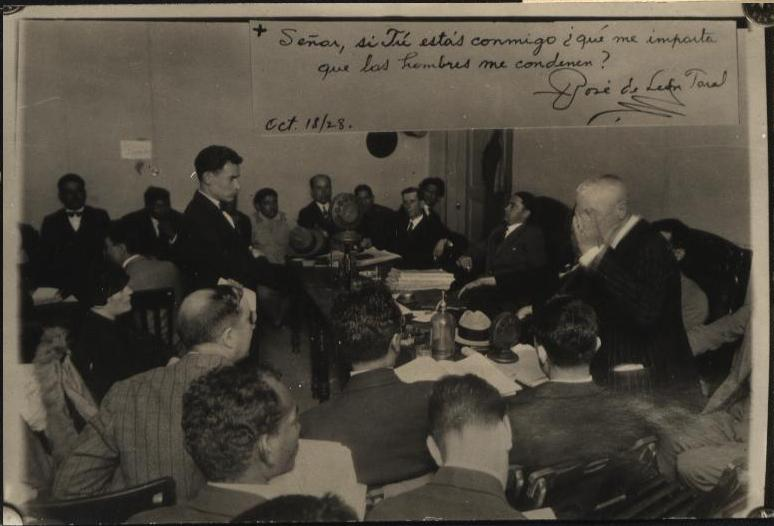
Trial of José de León Toral with annotation made by the accused.

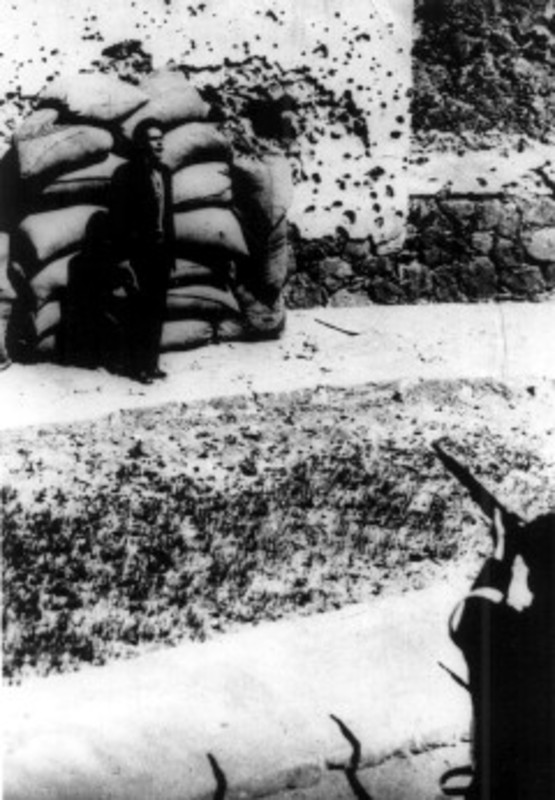
José de León Toral right before being executed by firing squad.

José de León Toral was sentenced to death and executed by firing squad on Saturday, February 9, 1929 in the Palacio de Lecumberri. His last words were ¡Viva Cristo Rey! (Long Live Christ the King!), the battle cry of the Cristeros. He was buried in the Spanish Pantheon.

=== Conspiracy theory ===
The Mexican writer Rius Facius rediscovered the testimony of the inspection of Obregón's corpse carried out by a doctor. The testimony stated that the body had bullet holes of different calibers, which suggested that more than one weapon was used to assassinate Obregón. This led to the theory that although José de León Toral undoubtedly fired one weapon, he was not the only one, and there were other shooters as well.

== Primary sources ==
De León Toral, José, and Concepción Acevedo y de la Llata. 1929. El Jurado De Toral Y La Madre Conchita : Lo Que Se Dijo Y Lo Que No Se Dijo En El Sensacional Juicio : Versión Taquigráfica Textual. Mexico, D.F: publisher not identified.

León Toral, José de, and Concepción Acevedo y de la Llata. 1928. Requisitoria Del Ministerio Público Y Alegatos De Los Defensores En El Jurado De José De León Toral Y Concepción Acevedo Y De La Llata : Reos Del Delito De Homicidio Proditorio Del General Alvaro Obregón. México: Talleres Gráficos de la Nación.

Toral de De León, Maria. 1972. Memorias De María Toral De De León [1. ed.] ed. México: Editorial Tradición.
