= Feminine Brigades of St. Joan of Arc =

Mexican secret military society

The Feminine Brigades of Saint Joan of Arc (Spanish: Las Brigadas Femeninas de Santa Juana de Arco) also known as Guerrilleras de Cristo (women-soldiers of Christ) was a secret military society for women founded on June 21, 1927 at the Basilica of Our Lady of Zapopan, in Zapopan, Jalisco, Mexico. The founders included Luz Laraza de Uribe (also known as General Tesia Richaud) and María Gollaz (María Ernestina Gollaz Gallardo, also known as "Celia Gómez, de Empleadas Católicas of Guadalajara" (UEC)), and their lay advisor, Luis Flores González.

Formed as a secret Catholic women's society that organized to support the Mexican Cristero War effort, they were affiliated with Unión Popular. Initial membership consisted of only 17 women but grew to 135 women members within a matter of days. At its height, the brigade was composed of 56 squadrons, totaling 25,000 female militants, most active in Jalisco, Guadalajara, and Mexico City.

== Recruitment, vows, and duties ==
Recruitment began in Catholic women's colleges but quickly spread among the indigenous population and across all social classes. Each member was to take vows of faith and absolute secrecy. The primary functions of the group were nursing wounded Cristero rebels and securing funds, food, information and shelter. The women also provided moral strength and encouragement for battlefield men, motivating the men in their families to follow and defend their beliefs.

Many of the first feminine Brigades were young, working-class women from the city. Soon, more women from rural regions also joined, and they facilitated munitions delivery by navigating areas where Cristeros were. As their membership increased, so did their duties, to the extent that they were often in the field of battle.

The women took a vow of faith and absolute secrecy in front of a crucifix, promising to die rather than betray the secrets and cause of the Cristeros, even if tortured or promised payment. No evidence supports that the vow was ever broken. The women in the Brigades sent President Calles letters and petitions explaining their concerns on Article 130 of the Mexican Constitution. They also protested, boycotted businesses that discriminated against its employees based on religion and publicly criticized government action, including the expelling of priests. The women also spread the Church's teachings, which included educating their children and teaching catechism. One duty was to spread propaganda with pamphlets throughout Mexico, explaining the mission of the main coordinating Cristero group, known as National League for the Defense of Religious Liberty (LNDLR). They published the newspaper La Dama Catolica, which also served as propaganda and a way to recruit women to the cause of the Cristeros.

Señoras, women associated with the Brigades and the UDCM (Union de Damas Catolicas de Mexico), were chiefly married, urban dwelling and middle and upper class. They offered religious teaching and childcare to working women and their families, donated food and clothes to charities and the needy, supported seminars and vocations and opened Catholic schools and libraries. All the women marched in protests, but only señoras submitted demands to the government ministry; señoras were the main "mouthpiece" for women of the Cristero cause.

Religiosas had to be less public than the señoras. They went underground to provide places for worship and sanctuaries for the Blessed Sacrament, and they hid wounded and fleeing Cristeros or families whose fathers died in war. They turned their homes into shelter and secret meeting centers for priests to hold Mass and other sacraments. They also provided food, clothing and shelter and offered spiritual advice and religious devotions for Cristeros. The penalty for being discovered was confinement in jail and legal prosecution. When the religiosas were discovered, government troops would search them aggressively and were often known to steal from them. The officials often found items from blessed marriages, coffins with bodies from funerals and documents of baptism, communion and other sacraments.

The religiosas were also responsible for a spy communication system (via mail, telegraph and verbal communication) warning Cristeros about soldiers' movements. The women also nursed, performed surgery, provided medical equipment, and were directly involved in the Feminine Brigades. They changed their locations frequently to avoid government troops.

The jovenes were usually young female active revolutionaries, including some religiosas who were sometimes in active battle alongside the Cristeros.

=== Complex logistics network ===
The Feminine Brigades were considered very independent and were credited by field commanders for sustaining the rebellion. They operated in squadrons to provide various kinds of ammunition, manufacturing it themselves and distributing it through a complex network of supply routes.

These women devised creative and clandestine ways to keep soldiers supplied, including special vests for smuggling ammunition out of federal factories and secret workshops for the production of homemade explosives, such as grenades made out of jelly tins. These 25,000 women also carried messages—written on silk and hidden within the soles of shoes—between units. All their activities were carried out under an oath of secrecy. The efforts of the Joan of Arc Brigades notwithstanding, the Cristero army never had enough ammunition to win a decisive victory. Too often, in the heat of battle, they had to disengage so as to live to fight another day.

By 1928 the Brigades had grown in numbers and efficiency and had become an important part of the Cristero effort. The Brigades at this point obeyed the LNDLR leadership only occasionally. The feud between the Brigades and the LNDLR resulted in a serious decrease in the flow of ammunition. Enrique Gorostieta y Valarde, the leader of the LNDLR, had to smooth out relations with the Feminine Brigades. Eventually, the friction was resolved, and the Brigades increased the supply of ammunition to the soldiers in the field.

With the decline of the rebellion and demobilization, the Feminine Brigades dissolved.

== Events ==
The Brigades collected funds, spread propaganda, and protested the government's actions. Among these protested actions were the government's expulsion of priests, since the Constitution guaranteed "exercise of all cults" and there were too few priests to do so. Even months afterward, when the Pope's representative, George J. Caruana, was expelled, their protests were unanswered.

In 1929, when two women were discovered in 1929 in Sahuayo wearing special munitions vests, the government started to become aware of their presence and the magnitude of their role in the Cristero war.

Doña Amada Diaz del Torre became the new director of a religious school that had been closed by the government in response to a misunderstanding about the Archbishop opposing anti-clerical laws being enforced, allowing it to continue running even after the previous leader fled. As a result, mothers sent a telegram to Secretary of Government asking for religious equality rights, and the Damas of Guadalajara protested the school closing and sent petitions and letters. None of the efforts were heard by Calles.

When not in hostilities, the Feminine Brigades "turned their energy to Catholic social action under the direct supervision of Archbishop Pascual Díaz." Minister of the Interior Adalberto Tejeda said to Sagrada Familia Church that if a similar case happened, he'd use firehoses on women and machine guns on men. In this Visitation school in Coyoacán, 48 nuns refused to give up habits. The women used their influence as mothers teaching the next generation as a threat. Elena lascurain gave critters asylum. In the Sagrada Familia Church protest, two women were killed and 16 wounded. In March 1926, when Catholic schools were closed to carry out the Calles Law prohibiting public Catholic religious practice and instruction, the Damas of Guadalajara rallied to support a petition signed by hundreds of mothers sent to the Secretary of Government as a telegram. The government sent troops to close Church of the Sacred Family in Colonia Roma, because they thought foreign priests were working there. The Damas wrote a letter to Calles and physically protested government troops in front of Sacred Family Church. UDC members and Servants of St. Zita blocked the entrance, refusing to move when the soldiers demanded. They were shot down with hoses and got up, throwing rocks at soldiers, until the men charged them away. A Feminine Brigade army of 5,000 women went to the governor's secretary and asked to meet with Colonel Tejada. They were denied, and a similar event happened to them, with the Police Inspector General Roberto Cruz lashing his whip at some of the women.

The señoras issued the statement "Men of the whole Republic, there are your models. Go hide your shame in the dark caverns of our forests." Many Mexicans seemed shocked at the use of force.

Women were not permitted in politics but could have moral influence, trying to help guide or educate people they believed were losing morals. They threatened the government with the educating power they had as mothers. The downturn of the economy limited how much the women could donate, but they tried to donate services and staff soup kitchens. They set up schools in the factories El Buen Toro (cigarettes) and Talleres Britania (shirts), teaching academics and Catholic faith. Under pressure from government-affiliated unions, both factories fired the mothers whose children were being educated. Mothers boycotted the factories in response.

The Feminine Brigades joined with La Liga, but they still worked independently and supported Enrique Gorostieta, who questioned La Liga's ability to direct a guerrilla war from Mexico City. Luis Beltran y Mendoza was a Liga representative who criticized the Feminine Brigades, saying it was unnatural and dangerous to have women following military orders, since they could show favoritism. Archbishop Orozco y Jimenez threatened to excommunicate the women if they kept running autonomously without religious male church leaders. In response, they changed their name to add Saint Joan of Arc, and Gregorio Aguilar and Fr Rafael Davila Vilchis were added as leaders by the archbishop. After the rebellion, many of the women married and stayed home.

On July 3 the "Ley Calles," or Calles Law, was officially announced, alarming the Knights of Columbus and the Asociacion Catolica de Juventud Mexicana (Catholic Association of Mexican Youth). The Damas stated that they would side with bishops no matter what occurred. Sra. Concepcion Lacsurain, Sra. Refugio Goribar de Cortina, and Sra. Juana Pimental de Labat were detained by the chief of police because of their promise to help la Liga with their mission in opposing the new legislature restricting Catholic religious practice.

The Damas of Guadalajara printed propaganda under Governor Luna Gonzalez's balcony office, promoting a boycott against the government. Gonzalez's wife also hid priests who were being searched for without him knowing.

In the Plaza of San Miguel Allende, Guanajuato, women passing out propaganda were detained by the chief of military operations and were threatened with rape by soldiers. The Damas requested their release, the crowd yelled "Death to the government and to Calles!" and the soldiers released the women.

Near Doblado Theater, the ACJM (Association Catolica de Juventus Mexicana or Catholic Association of Mexican Youth) were promoting the boycott of an afternoon show. No one bought tickets. The mayor reprimanded the women, but the women's leader Salvador Vargas was detained. A hostile crowd of people cried and threatened to release Vargas by force, so Vargas was released.

Carmen Torres Quesada wrote a letter to her cousin, saying that after the Calles Law was enforced, everything seemed to be dull, and people seemed to be sad. Places of diversion were closed, including the places boycotted. After the boycotts were called off by bishops in response to Catholic complaints, Damas kept spreading propaganda against the government in processions throughout Mexico. The uprisings turned into wars, so Damas were limited to collecting funds to free prisoners used for meal supply and the unemployed.

Doña Luz Noriega de Reguer's house served as a Cristeros asylum and propaganda/local meeting center; she helped la Liga spread propaganda.

Other women housed priests so they could minister secretly. Sra Elena Lascuraín, Sra. Arce, Sra. Pitman de Labarthe (last two, active Damas) and Amparo Morfín housed Cristero soldiers and religious men, including Heriberto Navarrete (Lascuraín housed him), 14 Jesuits (Morfín housed them), Father Julio Dávila and a world-renowned French mathematician-priest (Morfín housed them). They were never questioned by the police, and their houses served as a places for mass, marriages, and funerals.

In 1927, the Union of Damas Catolicas (Catholic Ladies) disassociated themselves from the rebellion when it became a war, because it had become too political. Señoras still helped independently of the UDC by distributing propaganda, housing priests and providing places of worship.

Las religiosas didn't become directly involved in war either but did have to go underground. In February 1926, religious schools were being closed. Madre Sample was a North American sister who had to evacuate the Visitation School in Mexico City. Students emptied the building carrying mattresses and bookcases. 49 schools closed within a few days, and 157 evacuated in the Federal District within a month. The sisters didn't want to submit and met with archbishops to see what they should do. The sisters published a mission statement, saying that they were willing to fight until their death for reform of the Constitution. The bishops agreed with their statement.

In Guadalajara, "Madre Anna" remembers her and her sisters having to remove their habits and disguise themselves in theater clothing to avoid being discovered by men sent by the government. The bishops told them to finish school quickly and leave the country. Some religious were raped by soldiers. Madre Anna and 40 other women found asylum in Laredo, Texas, and taught Mexican children there and in Louisiana. They went back to Mexico in 1931, when attacks on the Church got worse and Madre Anna said they suffered "enthusiastically for Christ."

Maria Esperanza sent a letter to Calles recalling nuns' good works in hospitals, schools and elderly homes and asking him to repeal the Calles Law, but he did not respond to it. Sisters were encouraged by some superiors in Rome to leave Mexico, but U.S. bishops advised them not to because of the Great Depression and the language barrier for teaching. Many religiosas found refuge with family and friends, because it was dangerous to live as group. In their homes, they hid the Blessed Sacrament behind crockery or books on shelves during the day and prayed at night.

Madre María del Carmen Gutierrez was a Brigada Sanitaria, a branch of the Feminine Brigades. In San Miguel, she was surprised by federal troops; the first time she hid the wounded successfully, the second time she had to flee, and all her patients were killed by federal troops. She then taught Christian doctrine to children in San Jose de la Presa but had to flee when a first communion celebration they were having was attacked by federal troops. She fled to nurse the wounded again until federal troops attacked them again, and she left country in July 1929. She later returned to Guadalajara to continue nursing. Petra Muñoz and Vicenta García, Sisters of Charity, also nursed wounded Cristero soldiers. They couldn't make fire because it could compromise their location to federal troops, so they lived on a diet of maize and wheat. They didn't have water, so they drank animal urine and liquid from uncultivated plants.

Madre Rosita was also in Feminine Brigades, and as a member, carried munitions and equipment to soldiers in the field in special vests. Her companions were caught and sent to Islas Marías, but she huddled in her seat and wasn't caught. Some sisters, including one of fifteen novices, Madre Espinosa, didn't know much except that there was government opposition; they didn't face this directly, since they stayed within the convent. Other religiosas were beaten, and some died of illness and other conditions. Madre Remedios of Jalisco, who was ill, and her sisters were evacuated by soldiers and beaten, and Madre Remedios died soon after. Madre Rosa was taken prisoner with her sisters, was isolated, and, starving, fell ill and died on April 3. Religiosas in Mexico feared rape. One of these women was Ester Torres Quesada. Soldiers attacked her convent and raped her sisters. She and a friend escaped and fled to Cuba.

Refugio Goribar de Cortina, active propagandist and UDC leader, said they would keep teaching catechism, consoling the sick and visiting hospitals, but they would focus on strengthening the Christian family. In response to Pius XI's emphasis on this, she said that "All other work of women is useless" and that they would obey what Church said.

The archbishop of Guadalajara offered to destroy documents to protect the identities of the women who survived after 1929 when the war ended. Historian Jean Meyer claims they controlled 54 towns of Jalisco, Colima, Durango, Nayarit and San Luis Potosí.

== Social Effects and Controversy ==
The UDCM (Union de Damas Catolicas Mexicanas or Union of Mexican Catholic Ladies) published La Dama Catolica to recruit more women to the cause. Its editor claimed that, even though the women did this, their place was still "in the home" teaching children Christian values, not in politics. To contribute through social activities, they held a national assembly and were involved with social and religious groups like Asociacion Catolica de Juventud Mexicana and la Liga.

in 1919, a Catholic worker's organization called La Semana Social stated that feminism in the form of social activism and politics was irreligious and that women should be restricted to teaching about Catholicism within traditional roles. For saying that they would carry out the mission of restoring their religious practice and opposing the enforced Article 130, the women often faced "fines, confiscation of property, arrests, and imprisonment" in unhealthy conditions.

Archbishop Jose Mora y del Rio may have founded the UDCM or appointed Jesuit Carlos Heredia to do so. The UDCM focused on helping the poor and working class through education (while remaining within the Church-accepted realm of charity, children and the home). Protestant and liberal critics accused the church of making women into "things" simply for their husbands' sexual interest, to which the UDCM responded by calling women to stop being "beautiful animals" and actually help socially, which they saw as "reasonable feminism."

Father Medina told women they couldn't be indifferent or retain wealthy egoism, but the señoras rewarded themselves as "generous" and believed their "altruism" would soften the poor's attitude towards the rich. Historians have said that UDCM could be seen as the clergy's puppet organization, but others say that Father Leopoldo Icaza couldn't oversee all 15 regional sections.

Some Catholic groups didn't find it proper for women to be so socially involved in the war. Leobardo Fernandez and Roman Martinez Silva sent details to the Vatican, which created insecurities and inner divisions on the side supporting the Cristeros. This left them more vulnerable to government attack. In June 1929, General Tesia Richaud (Luz Laraza de Uribe) was one of the women detained, captured, beaten and tortured. She died saying the slogan of the Cristeros - "Viva Cristo Rey" or "Long Live Christ the King."

== See also ==
- Saint Joan of Arc
- The Cristero War
- Mexican Revolution
- National Action Party (Mexico)
- List of wars involving Mexico
- Secret society
