= Battle of Tepatitlán =

- Part of the Cristero War
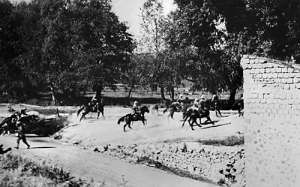
- A photo of the Battle of Tepatitlán
| Date | April 19, 1929 |
| Location | Tepatitlán, Jalisco, Mexico |
| Result | Cristero victory |

Belligerents
| Cristeros | Mexico |

Commanders and leaders
| José Reyes Vega † | Saturnino Cedillo; Pablo Rodríguez |

Strength
| 4,000 | 4,500 |

Casualties and losses
| 25 killed | 120 killed |

The Battle of Tepatitlán was fought on April 19, 1929, at Tepatitlán in the state of Jalisco between the Cristeros and the army of the Mexican government. The government army was composed of 500 soldiers and 4,000 militia. The Cristeros were victorious but their leader Father Jose Reyes Vega was killed.

According to Jean Meyer, the battle was on April 19. Fr. Vega commanded three regiments in a pincer movement which enveloped six Federal units. On the other hand, Moisés González Navarro confirms that Fr. Vega was killed in the battle, but he states that it occurred on April 20.
