= Alberto Gutierrez =

Alberto Gutierrez may refer to:

- Alberto B. Gutiérrez, Mexican General during the Cristero War (1926–29)
- Alberto Díaz Gutiérrez (1928–2001), Cuban photographer
- Alberto Gutierrez; see List of Philippine Basketball Association players
- Alberto Gutiérrez, supporting actor in Nada personal (telenovela)
- Alberto Gutiérrez (born 1980), member of the 1997 FIFA U-17 World Championship squads
