= Ann Ball =

Catholic writer (1944–2008)

- Born: Ann Ervin Bolton Ball; May 13, 1944
- Died: June 8, 2008 (aged 64); Houston, Texas
- Education: University of Houston (B.S.)
- Spouse: Elden Ray Ball (m. 1964; div. 1981)
- Children: 3

Ann Ervin Bolton Ball (May 13, 1944 – June 8, 2008) was a Catholic author, who wrote several books on Catholic Saints, history, and culture.

== Life and career ==
Ball was born in 1944, a daughter of Ora Louise and Julian Bolton. She graduated Jacksonville High School in 1962 and went on to earn her Bachelor of Science from the University of Houston.

Throughout her career, Ball held a variety of jobs, working as an author, school teacher, private investigator and operator for a security company. Following her workday, Ball would then author books on Catholicism, ranging from spirituality to history. She held a special interest in Hispanic Catholicism, especially regarding the life of Miguel Pro, who she authored a book on. Ball wrote that she was especially inspired by Pope John Paul II, who she considered a hero for acting on the calls of the Second Vatican Council.

She died from a heart attack on June 8, 2008, in Houston, Texas, survived by her two sons, a daughter, and eight grandchildren.

== Selected bibliography ==
- Modern Saints: Their Lives and Faces. Vol. 1. (Rockford, Illinois: TAN Books and Publishers, 1983)
- A Litany of Mary. (Huntington, Indiana: Our Sunday Visitor Publishing Division, 1988)
- Holy Names of Jesus. (Huntington, Indiana: Our Sunday Visitgor Publishing Division, 1990)
- The Persecuted Church. (Avon, New Jersey: Magnificat Press, 1990)
- Modern Saints: Their Lives and Faces Vol. 2. (Rockford, Illinois: TAN Books and Publishers, 1990)
- A Litany of Saints. (Huntington, Indiana: Our Sunday Visitor Publishing Division, 1993)
- A Handbook of Catholic Sacramentals. (Huntington, Indiana: Our Sunday Visitor Publishing Division, 1991)
- Catholic Traditions in Cooking. (Huntington, Indiana: Our Sunday Visitor Publishing Division, 1993)
- Catholic Book of the Dead. (Huntington, Indiana: Our Sunday Visitor Publishing Division, 1995)
- Blessed Miguel Pro: 20th Century Mexican Martyr. (Rockford, Illinois: TAN Books and Publishers, 1996)
- Catholic Traditions in Crafts. (Huntington, Indiana: Our Sunday Visitor Publishing Division, 1997)
- Catholic Traditions in the Garden. (Huntington, Indiana: Our Sunday Visitor Publishing Division, 1998)
- Faces of Holiness: Modern Saints in Photos and Words. (Huntington, Indiana: Our Sunday Visitor Publishing Division, 1998)
- A Saint for Your Name: Saints for Girls. revision of the work by Albert J. Nevins, M.M. (Huntington, Indiana: Our Sunday Visitor Publishing Division, 2000)
- A Saint for Your Name: Saints for Boys. revision of the work by Albert J. Nevins, M.M. (Huntington, Indiana: Our Sunday Visitor Publishing Division, 2000)
- Faces of Holiness: Modern Saints in Photos and Words vol. 2. (Huntington, Indiana: Our Sunday Visitor Publishing Division, 2001)
- The Saints Guide to Joy and Laughter. (Ann Arbor, Michigan: Servant Publications, 2001)
- Prayers for Prisoners. with Max, S.F.O. (Huntington, Indiana: Our Sunday Visitor Publishing Division, 2002)
- Encyclopedia of Catholic Devotion and Practices. (Huntington, Indiana: Our Sunday Visitor Publishing Division, 2002)
- Young Faces of Holiness. (Huntington, Indiana: Our Sunday Visitor Publishing Division, 2003)
- OSV's Catholic Encyclopedia for Children. (Huntington, Indiana: Our Sunday Visitor Publishing Division, 2003)
