= René Capistrán Garza =

Mexican Catholic activist (1898–1974)

René Capistrán Garza (26 January 1898 – 19 September 1974) was a leader of the Mexican Association of Catholic Youth (ACJM).

Born in Tampico, Tamaulipas, on 26 January 1898 Capistrán Garza studied law at the Universidad Nacional Autonoma de Mexico (UNAM). He was a cofounder and president of the ACJM (Catholic Association of Mexican Youth), leader of the National League Defender of Religious Liberty and one of the leaders of Cristeros. Following his return from exile (during which time he lived in San Antonio Texas and later Havana, Cuba), he worked as a journalist and screenwriter in Mexico

Garza Capistrán ordered to mobilize its more than 100 local organizations to form committees for the National League for the Defense of Religious Liberty, LNDLR. Thus, members of the ACJM became the leaders of the LNDLR, whose official foundation was announced on 21 March 1925.

== Calles Law ==
The 1924 election of Plutarco Elías Calles, a strident atheist. Calles applied the anti-clerical laws stringently throughout the country and added his own anti-clerical legislation. In June 1926, he signed the "Law for Reforming the Penal Code", known unofficially as the "Calles Law". This provided specific penalties for priests and individuals who violated the provisions of the 1917 Constitution.

In response to these measures, Catholic organizations began to intensify their resistance. The most important of these groups was the National League for the Defense of Religious Liberty, founded in 1924. This was joined by the Mexican Association of Catholic Youth (founded 1913) and the Popular Union, a Catholic political party founded in 1925.

== Non-support from U.S. ==
Lack of a long-term plan, however, took some of the steam out of these initial victories. Capistran Garza had been a great one for creating pious fervor, but he was not the man to organize an armed rebellion. His job, as he saw it, was to cross the border and stir up sympathy for the Cristero cause among U.S. Catholics, sympathy that would translate into large gifts of cash with which to buy desperately needed ammunition. Garza knew that American support would dictate the outcome of the war, but the U.S. bishops were reluctant to give any sign of supporting an armed rebellion against a government recognized by the United States. Meanwhile, most of the Mexican bishops were looking for a negotiated settlement. Garza's northern sojourn yielded almost no fruit.

== Later career ==
After returning to Mexico, Capistran Garza worked as a script-writer, credited with one of the masterpieces of Mexico's "Golden Age of Cinema," the 1942 "La virgen que forjó una patria" ("The Saint Who Forged A Country"), starring Mexican-born U.S. silent film actor, Ramon Novarro, as Juan Diego, in his only Mexican role.

He also worked as a journalist and film critic, as well as writing various books on the subject of the Virgin of Guadaloupe.
