= José Reyes Vega =

Mexican priest and Cristero general

- External image
- José Reyes Vega with horse

José Reyes Vega was a Mexican priest who participated in the Cristero War as a general. He was known as "Father Vega".

On April 19, 1927, an event took place that almost succeeded in extinguishing the revolution. He led a raid against a train in La Barca, Jalisco, said to be carrying a shipment of money. In a shootout that followed with the army escort, Vega's younger brother was killed. Maddened with grief, he had the wooden cars doused with gasoline, and 51 civilian passengers were burned alive. After one engagement, he had federal prisoners stabbed to death to save ammunition. The atrocity helped to turn public opinion against the Cristeros.

The Cristeros mounted an attack on Guadalajara in late March. Though it failed, the rebels won a smashing victory at the Battle of Tepatitlán against Saturnino Cedillo, in the heart of Los Altos, on April 19. Vega, who designed the plan that won the victory, was killed in the engagement.

== See also ==
- Cristero War
- Battle of Tepatitlán
- For Greater Glory: The True Story of Cristiada, 2012 film by Dean Wright
