= Alberto B. Gutiérrez =

Mexican military personnel

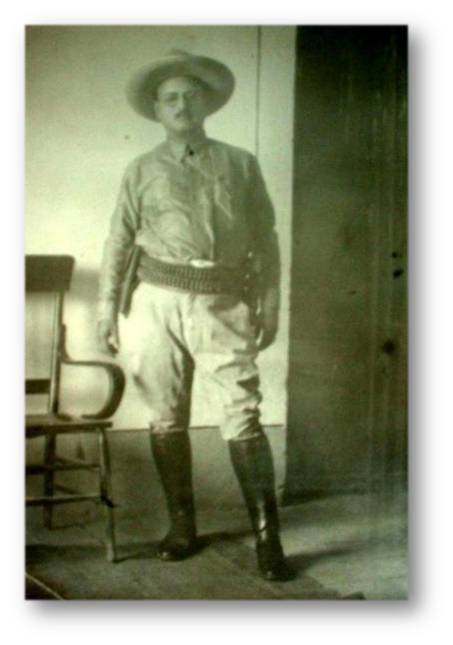
Alberto B. Gutiérrez

General Alberto B. Gutiérrez was a Cristero officer who participated in the Cristero War. He held the rank of general. General Alberto B. Gutierrez was given by the night of May 23, in the morning, to fly dynamite in the Black Bridge and Tunnel railway that runs from Colima, Colima to Manzanillo, Colima, plus trash the railroad to prevent federal forces under General Heliodorus Charis from entering Manzanillo to defend the place. To achieve his mission, he was given a mule with a bomb in Camotlán de Miraflores. Gutierrez missed the train and did not solitary confine to Manzanillo.

== See also ==
- Primary Chiefs and Officers Cristero
