= Anacleto González Flores =

Mexican Catholic martyr, lawyer, and Blessed (1888–1938)

Blessed Anacleto González Flores
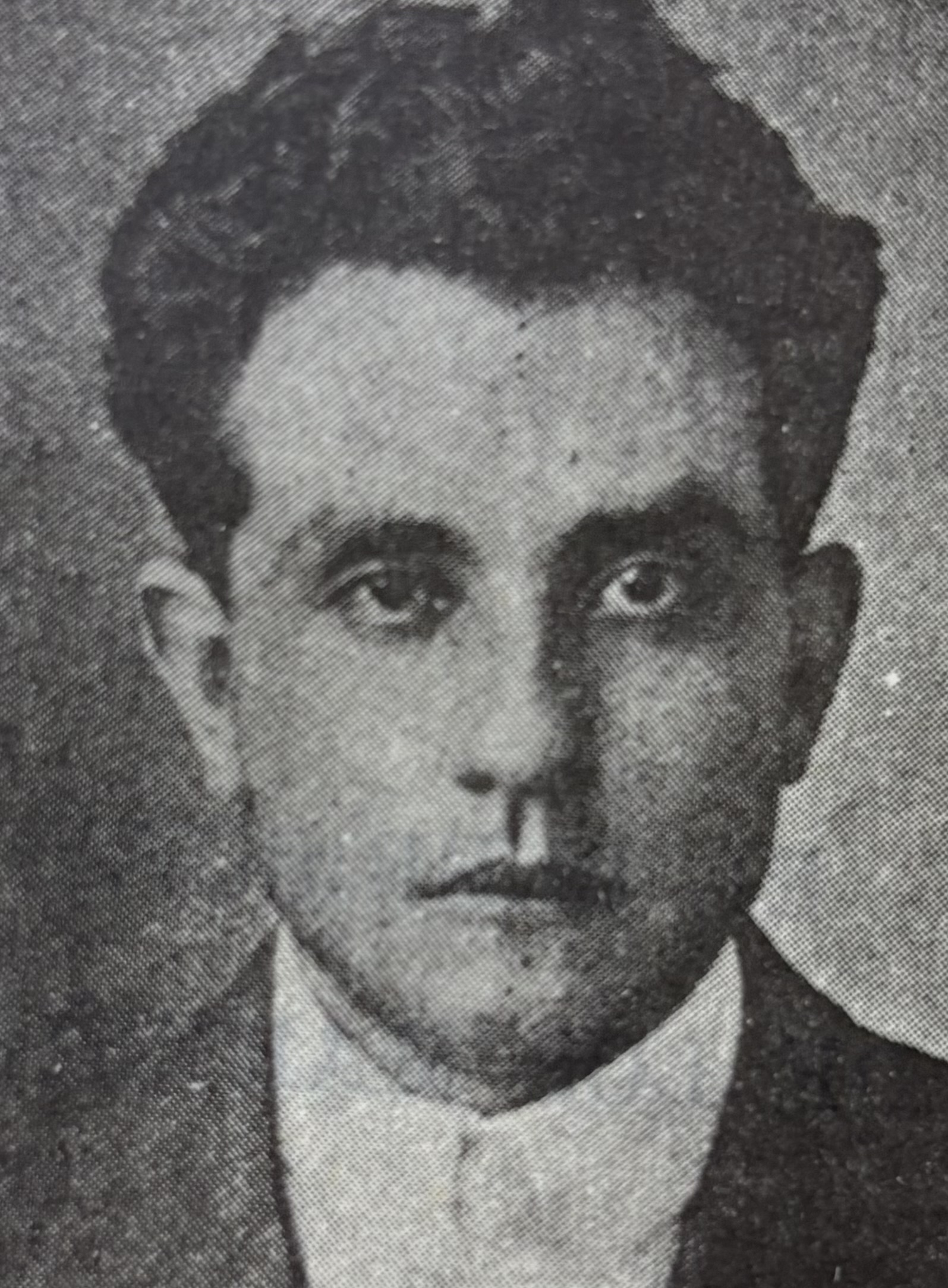
- Portrait of González

Martyr
- Born: July 13, 1888; Tepatitlán, Jalisco, Mexico
- Died: April 1, 1927 (aged 38); Guadalajara, Jalisco, Mexico
- Cause of death: Execution by firing squad
- Venerated in: Catholic Church
- Beatified: November 20, 2005, Guadalajara, Jalisco, Mexico by Cardinal José Saraiva Martins (on behalf of Pope Benedict XVI)
- Feast: November 20

Anacleto González Flores (July 13, 1888 – April 1, 1927) was a Mexican Catholic layman and lawyer who was tortured and executed during the persecution of the Catholic Church under Mexican President Plutarco Elías Calles.

González was beatified by Pope Benedict XVI as a martyr on November 20, 2005.

== Background ==
When González was killed, Mexico was under the rule of President Plutarco Elías Calles, who was violently anticlerical and anti-Catholic. Mexico was undergoing what the British author Graham Greene called the "fiercest persecution of religion anywhere since the reign of Elizabeth."

== Early life ==
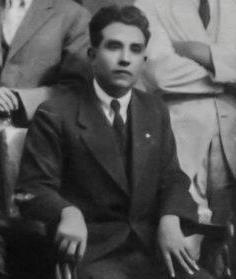
González in 1919

Anacleto González Flores was born on July 13, 1888, in Tepatitlán, Jalisco. He was the second of twelve children born to the poor family of Valentín González Sánchez and María Flores Navarro. González was baptized the day after his birth.

A Roman Catholic priest who was a friend of the family recognized Gonzáles's intelligence and recommended him for the minor seminary. There, Gonzáles excelled and earned the nickname "Maestro." After deciding that he did not have the calling to Holy Orders, González began the study of law at Escuela Libre de Derecho in Guadalajara and became an attorney in 1922. The same year he married María Concepción Guerrero, and they had two children.

González attended Mass daily and engaged in numerous works of charity, including visiting prisoners and teaching the catechism.

== Career ==
González became an activist, led the Catholic Association of Mexican Youth (ACJM), and founded the magazine La Palabra, which criticised the anticlerical and anti-Catholic articles of the Constitution of 1917. He was the founder and president of the Popular Union (UP), which organized Catholics to resist the persecution of the church.

Originally, González supported passive resistance against the government since he had studied the methods of Mahatma Gandhi. However, in 1926, he learned of the murder of four members of the Catholic Association of Mexican Youth, joined the National League for the Defense of Religious Liberty, and supported the coming rebellion. He wrote, "the country is a jail for the Catholic Church.... We are not worried about defending our material interests because these come and go; but our spiritual interests, these we will defend because they are necessary to obtain our salvation."

In January 1927, after they had endured religious persecution and state atheism, Mexican Catholics took up arms and set off the Cristero War. González did not take up arms but gave speeches that encouraged Catholics to support the Cristeros with money, food, accommodation, and clothing. He wrote pamphlets and gave speeches that supported his opposition to the anticlerical government.

Seeking to crush the rebellion, the government sought to capture the leaders of the Popular Union and the National League for the Defense of Religious Liberty. González was captured and framed with charges that he murdered an American, Edgar Wilkens, but the government knew that Wilkens had been killed by a robber, Guadalupe Zuno.

== Martyrdom ==
González was tortured, including being hung by his thumbs pulling them out of their sockets, having his shoulder fractured with a rifle butt, and having the bottom of his feet slashed. On April 1, 1927, he was executed by firing squad. Echoing the words of the assassinated Ecuadorian President Gabriel García Moreno, who defied the forces seeking to suppress his faith, González's last words were "Hear Americas for the second time: I die but God does not! Viva Cristo Rey!"

Wilkens's widow, who knew that González had been framed, wrote a letter of protest to Washington, DC, which exonerated him. A letter staying his execution arrived shortly after he had been shot.

== In popular culture ==
González was portrayed by the actor Eduardo Verástegui in the film For Greater Glory (Spanish: Cristada), which also starred Andy Garcia, Eva Longoria, and Peter O'Toole.

== Sources ==
- Cruz, Joan Carrol (2003). Saintly Men of Modern Times. Our Sunday Visitor Publishing. pp. 40–42. ISBN 1-931709-77-7.
