= Miguel Pro =

Mexican Jesuit priest, martyr and blessed (1891–1927)

Blessed Miguel Pro SJ
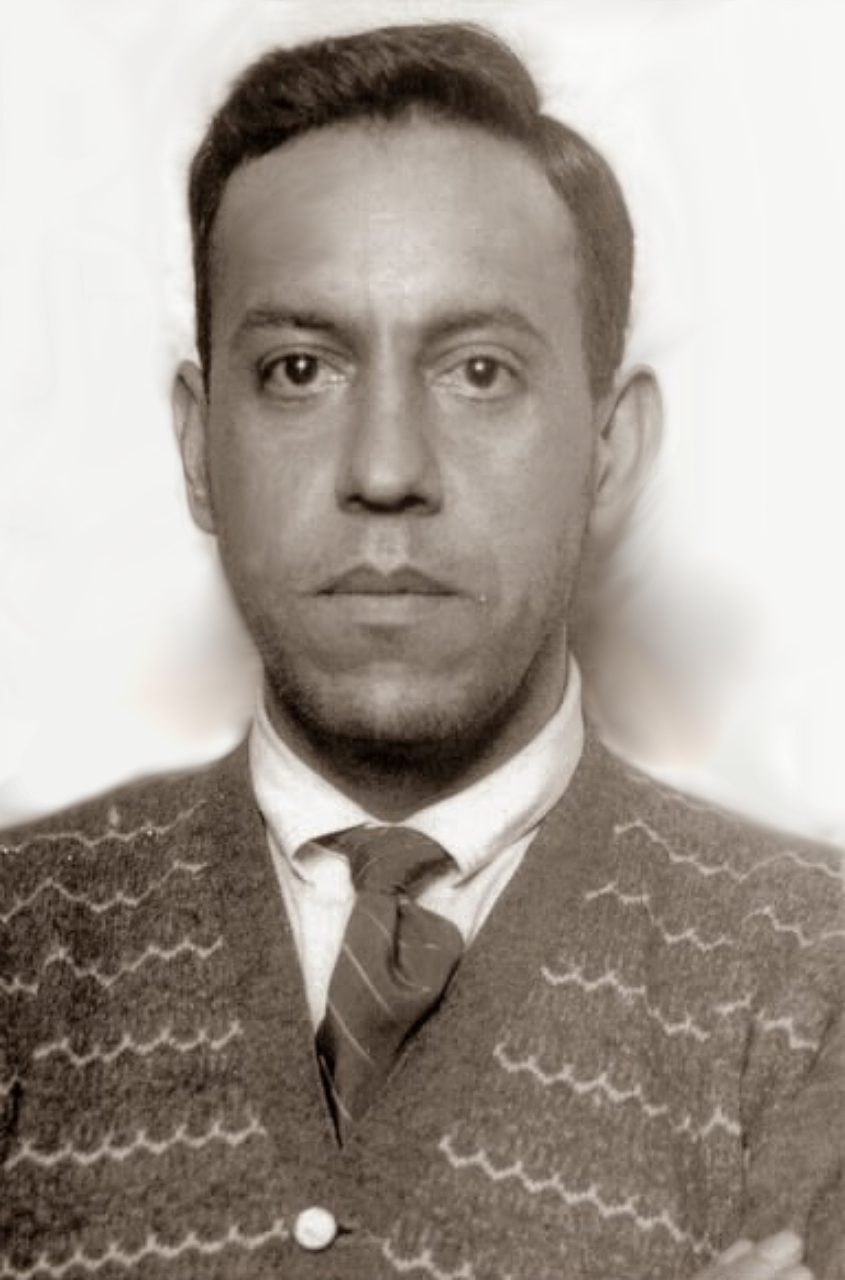

Martyr
- Born: January 13, 1891; Guadalupe, Zacatecas, Mexico
- Died: November 23, 1927 (aged 36); Mexico City, Mexico
- Venerated in: Catholic Church; Lutheran Church
- Beatified: 25 September, 1988, Saint Peter's Square, Rome by Pope John Paul II
- Feast: 23 November

José Ramón Miguel Agustín Pro Juárez, also known as Blessed Miguel Pro, SJ (January 13, 1891 – November 23, 1927) was a Mexican Jesuit priest executed under the presidency of Plutarco Elías Calles on the false charges of bombing and attempted assassination of former Mexican President Álvaro Obregón.

Pro's arrest, without a trial or evidential support, gained prominence during the Cristero War. Known for his religious piety and innocence, he was beatified in Rome on September 25, 1988, by Pope John Paul II as a Catholic martyr, killed in odium fidei ("in hatred of the faith").

== Historical background ==
At the time of Pro's death, Mexico was ruled by fiercely anti-clerical and anti-Catholic President Plutarco Elías Calles who had begun what writer Graham Greene called the "fiercest persecution of religion anywhere since the reign of Elizabeth."

== Childhood ==
Miguel Pro, whose full name was José Ramón Miguel Agustín, was born into a mining family on January 13, 1891, in Guadalupe, Zacatecas. He was the third of eleven children, four of whom had died as infants or young children. From a young age, he was called "Cocol" as a nickname. Two of his sisters joined a convent. He entered the Jesuit novitiate at El Llano on August 15, 1911.

== Jesuit life in Mexico, persecution, exile abroad, and ordination ==
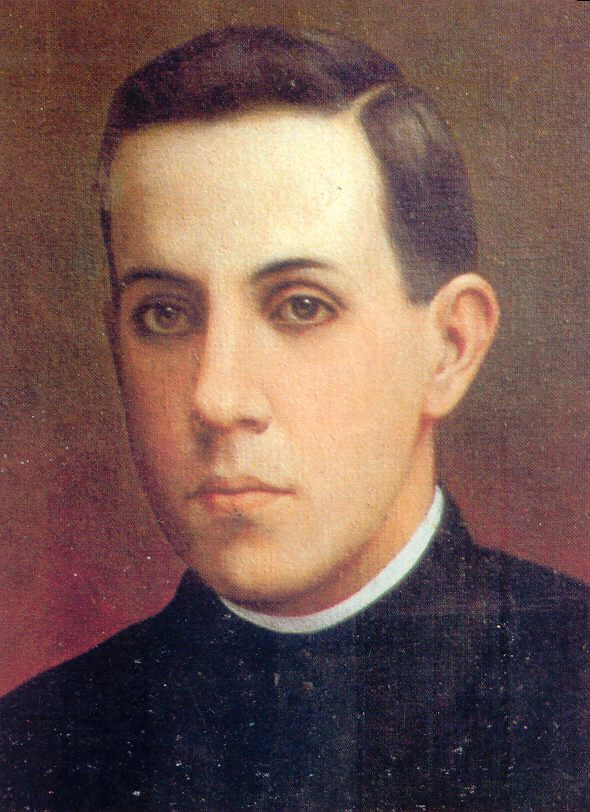
Blessed Miguel Agustín Pro, Mexican Jesuit, executed by a firing squad in Mexico (1927) for exercising his priestly ministry

One of his companions, Pulido, said that he "had never seen such an exquisite wit, never coarse, always sparkling." He was noted for his charity and ability to speak about spiritual subjects without boring his audience. Pulido remarked that there were two Pros: the playful Pro and the prayerful Pro. He was known for the long periods he spent in the chapel.

Long-time President of Mexico Porfirio Díaz was ousted in 1911 after staging a rigged reelection, and a struggle for power – the Mexican Revolution – began.

Pro studied in Mexico until 1914 when a massive wave of governmental anti-Catholicism forced the novitiate to dissolve and the Jesuits to flee to Los Gatos, California, in the United States. He then went to study in Granada, Spain (1915–19), and from 1919 to 1922 taught in Nicaragua.

Back in Mexico, a new constitution for the country had been signed (1917). Five articles of the 1917 Constitution of Mexico were particularly aimed at suppression of the Catholic Church. Article 3 mandated secular education in schools, prohibiting the Church from participating in primary and secondary education. Article 5 outlawed monastic religious orders. Article 24 forbade public worship outside of church buildings, while Article 27 restricted religious organizations' rights to own property. Finally, Article 130 revoked basic civil rights of clergy members: priests and religious workers were prevented from wearing their habits, were denied the right to vote, and were forbidden from commenting on public affairs to the press. Most of the anti-clerical provisions of the constitution were removed in 1998.

For his theological studies Pro was sent to Enghien, Belgium, where the French Jesuits (also in exile) had their faculty of Theology. His health continued to deteriorate. There he was ordained a priest on August 31, 1925. He wrote on that occasion: "How can I explain to you the sweet grace of the Holy Spirit, which invades my poor miner's soul with such heavenly joys? I could not hold back the tears on the day of my ordination, above all at the moment when I pronounced, together with the bishop, the words of the consecration. After the ceremony the new priests gave their first blessing to their parents. I went to my room, laid out all the photographs of my family on the table, and then blessed them from the bottom of my heart."

His first assignment as a priest was to work with the miners of Charleroi, Belgium. Despite the socialist, communist, and anarchist tendencies of the workers, he was able to win them over and preach the Gospel to them.

Three months after ordination, he was forced to undergo several operations for ulcers. He remained cheerful and courageous, explaining that the source of his strength was his prayer.

== Return to Mexico ==
In summer 1926 – his studies in Europe completed – Pro returned to Mexico. On the way he visited Lourdes where he celebrated Mass and visited the grotto of Our Lady of Lourdes.

Pro arrived at Veracruz on July 8, 1926. Plutarco Elías Calles was now president of Mexico. Unlike his predecessors, Calles vigorously enforced the anti-Catholic provisions of the 1917 constitution, implementing the so-called Calles Law, which provided specific penalties for priests who criticized the government (five years' imprisonment) or wore clerical garb in certain situations outside their churches (500 pesos). This law went into effect on July 31, 1926.

By this time, some states, such as Tabasco under the notorious anti-Catholic Tomás Garrido Canabal, had closed all the churches and cleared the entire state of openly serving priests, killing many of them, forcing a few to marry, the remaining few serving covertly at risk of their lives. On his return Pro served a Church which was forced to go "underground". He celebrated the Eucharist clandestinely and ministered the other sacraments to small groups of Catholics.

Details of Pro's ministry in the underground church come from his many letters, signed with the nickname Cocol. In October 1926, a warrant for his arrest was issued. He was arrested and released from prison the next day, but kept under surveillance.

== Arrest and execution ==
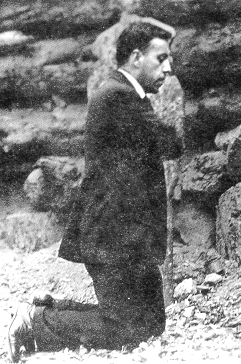
Miguel Pro's last request was to be allowed to kneel and pray.

A failed attempt to assassinate Álvaro Obregón, which only wounded him, in November 1927, provided the state with a pretext for arresting Pro again, this time with his brothers Humberto and Roberto. A young engineer who confessed his part in the attempted assassination testified that the Pro brothers were not involved. Miguel and his brothers were taken to the Detective Inspector's Office in Mexico City.

On November 23, 1927, Pro was executed without trial. President Calles gave orders to have Pro executed for the assassination attempt. Calles had the execution meticulously photographed, and the newspapers throughout the country carried photos on the front page the following day. Presumably, Calles thought that the sight of the pictures would frighten the Cristero rebels who were fighting against his troops, particularly in the state of Jalisco. However, they had the opposite effect.

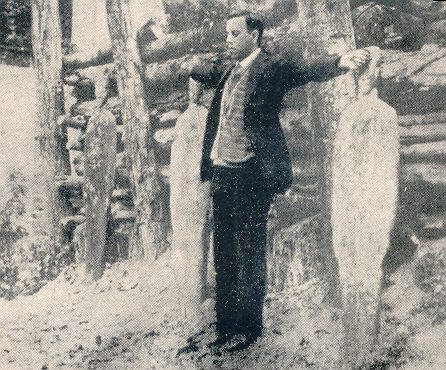
On 23 November 1927, Miguel Agustín Pro, Mexican Jesuit, is executed by a firing squad (in Mexico City).

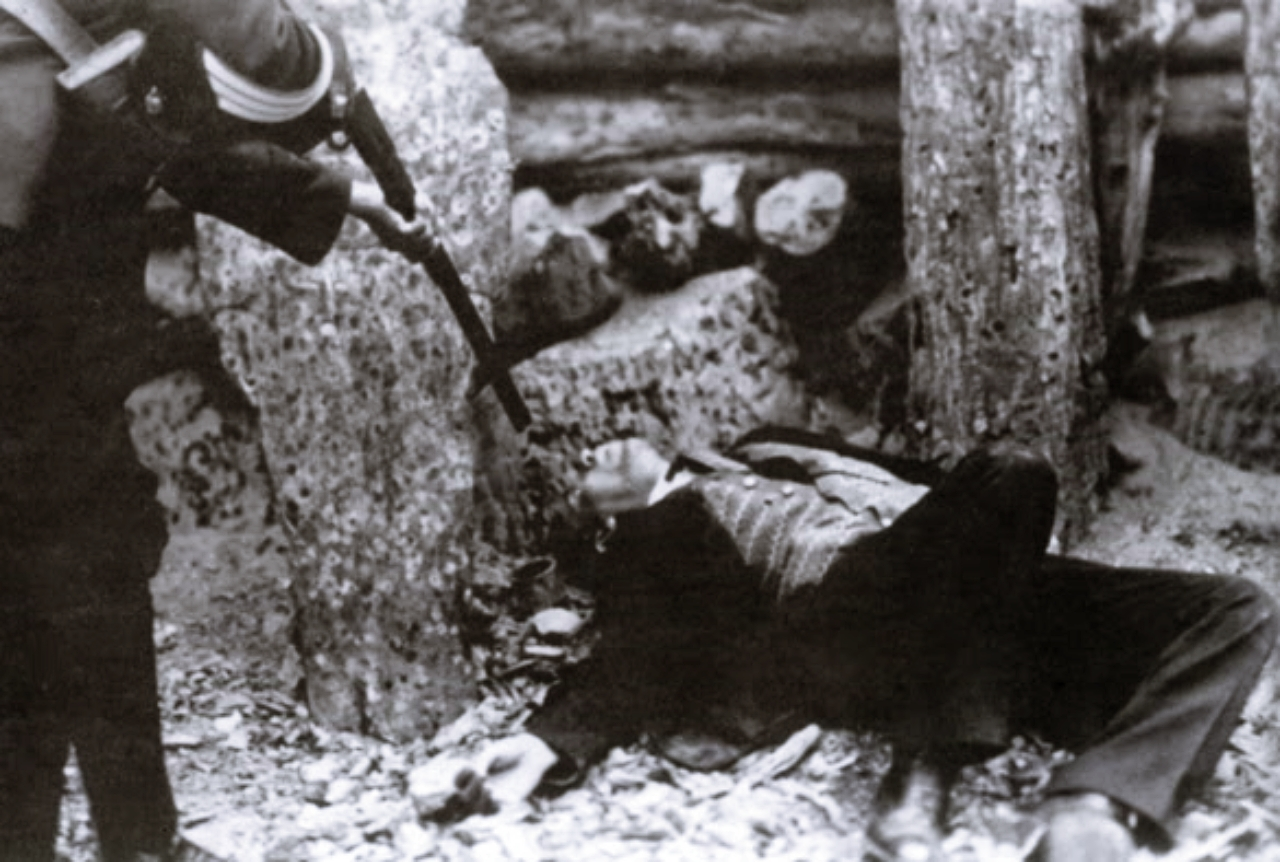
When the firing squad shots failed to kill him, a soldier administered a coup de grâce.

Pro and his brothers were visited by Generals Roberto Cruz and Palomera Lopez around 11 p.m. on November 22, 1927. The next day, as Pro walked from his cell to the courtyard and the firing squad, he blessed the soldiers, knelt, and briefly prayed quietly. Declining a blindfold, he faced his executioners with a crucifix in one hand and a rosary in the other and held his arms out in imitation of the crucified Christ and shouted out, "May God have mercy on you! May God bless you! Lord, Thou knowest that I am innocent! With all my heart I forgive my enemies!" Before the firing squad was ordered to shoot, Pro raised his arms in imitation of Christ and shouted the defiant cry of the Cristeros, "¡Viva Cristo Rey!" – "Long live Christ the King!". When the initial shots of the firing squad failed to kill him, a soldier shot him at point-blank range.

Calles is reported to have looked down upon a throng of 40,000 which lined Pro's funeral procession. Another 20,000 waited at the cemetery where he was buried without a priest present, his father saying the final words. The Cristeros became more animated and fought with renewed enthusiasm, many of them carrying the newspaper photo of Pro before the firing squad.

Funeral procession of Miguel and Humberto Pro Juárez following their execution, November 1927.

== Beatification ==
Pro's spiritual writings were approved by theologians on 1 June 1947, and his cause was formally opened on 11 January 1952, granting him the title of Servant of God.

At Pro's beatification in Saint Peter's Square on September 25, 1988, Pope John Paul II said:

Neither suffering nor serious illness, nor the exhausting ministerial activity, frequently carried out in difficult and dangerous circumstances, could stifle the radiating and contagious joy which he brought to his life for Christ and which nothing could take away. Indeed, the deepest root of self-sacrificing surrender for the lowly was his passionate love for Jesus Christ and his ardent desire to be conformed to him, even unto death.
