= Cristero War =

1926–1929 armed rebellion in Mexico over church–state relations

- Collage of six photos from the Cristero War, 1926–1929
Date	3 August 1926 – 21 June 1929 (2 years, 10 months, 2 weeks and 4 days)
Location	Mexico
Result	Ceasefire Mexican government and Catholic Church representatives reach the 1929 accords known as the Arreglos, mediated by United States ambassador Dwight W. Morrow Government grants amnesty to Cristero combatants who lay down their arms

Belligerents
(Mexico) Mexican government; Mexican Army; Diplomatic support: United States	Cristeros; National League for the Defense of Religious Liberty; Support: Knights of Columbus Various Catholic organizations and supporters

Commanders and leaders
Plutarco Elías Calles; Emilio Portes Gil; Joaquín Amaro Domínguez; Saturnino Cedillo; Heliodoro Charis; Marcelino García Barragán; Jaime Carrillo; Genovevo Rivas Guillén	Enrique Gorostieta Velarde †; José Reyes Vega †; Alberto B. Gutiérrez; Aristeo Pedroza; Andrés Salazar; Carlos Carranza Bouquet †; Dionisio Eduardo Ochoa †; Damaso Barraza; Domingo Anaya †; Jesús Degollado Guízar; Luis Navarro Origel †; Lauro Rocha; Lucas Cuevas †; Matías Villa Michel; Miguel Márquez Anguiano; Manuel Michel; Victoriano Ramírez †; Victorino Bárcenas †

Strength
(Mexico) ~100,000 men (1929)	~50,000 men and women (1929)

Casualties and losses
(Mexico) 56,882 dead	30,000–50,000 dead
- Estimated 250,000 dead, including civilians

The Cristero War (Spanish: La guerra cristera), also known as the Cristero Rebellion or La Cristiada [la kɾisˈtjaða], was a widespread struggle in central and western Mexico from 3 August 1926 to 21 June 1929 in response to the implementation of secularist and anticlerical articles of the 1917 Constitution. The rebellion was instigated as a response to an executive decree by Mexican President Plutarco Elías Calles to strictly enforce Article 130 of the Constitution, an implementing act known as the Calles Law. Calles sought to limit the power of the Catholic Church in Mexico and its affiliated organizations and to suppress popular religiosity.

The rural uprising in north-central Mexico was tacitly supported by the Church hierarchy and was aided by urban Catholic supporters. The Mexican Army received support from the United States. American Ambassador Dwight Morrow brokered negotiations between the Calles government and the Church. The government made some concessions, the Church withdrew its support for the Cristero fighters, and the conflict ended in 1929. The rebellion has been variously interpreted as a major event in the struggle between church and state that dates back to the 19th century with the War of Reform, and as the last major peasant uprising in Mexico after the end of the military phase of the Mexican Revolution in 1920. The end of the first conflict did not bring an immediate end to armed resistance. In the latter half of the 1930s a second wave of armed resistance emerged, partly in response to socialist education reforms implemented by the Mexican government. The period of conflict became known as the Second Cristero War (La Segunda). Although smaller in scale than the first Cristero War, the conflict continued in the late 1930s and in some regions persisted into the early 1940s.

== Background ==
=== Mexican Revolution ===
The Mexican Revolution started in 1910 against the dictatorship of Porfirio Díaz and for the masses' demand of land for the peasantry. Francisco I. Madero was the first revolutionary leader. He was elected president in November 1911 but was overthrown and executed in 1913 by conservative General Victoriano Huerta in a series of events now known as the Ten Tragic Days. After Huerta seized power, Archbishop Leopoldo Ruiz y Flóres from Morelia published a letter condemning the coup and distancing the Church from Huerta. The newspaper of the National Catholic Party, representing the views of the bishops, severely attacked Huerta and so the new regime jailed the party's president and halted the publication of the newspaper. Nevertheless, some members of the party participated in Huerta's regime, such as Eduardo Tamariz. The revolutionary generals Venustiano Carranza, Francisco Villa and Emiliano Zapata, who won against Huerta's Federal Army under the Plan of Guadalupe, had friends among Catholics and the local parish priests who aided them but also blamed high-ranking Catholic clergy for supporting Huerta.

=== 1917 Mexican Constitution ===
The 1917 Constitution was drafted by the Constituent Congress, convened by Venustiano Carranza in September 1916, and it was approved on 5 February 1917. It was based on the previous 1857 Constitution, which had been instituted by Benito Juárez. Articles 3, 27, and 130 of the 1917 Constitution contained articles that restricted the power and the influence of the Catholic Church.

The first two sections of Article 3 stated: "I. According to the religious liberties established under article 24, educational services shall be secular and, therefore, free of any religious orientation. II. The educational services shall be based on scientific progress and shall fight against ignorance, ignorance's effects, servitudes, fanaticism and prejudice." The second section of Article 27 stated: "All religious associations organized according to article 130 and its derived legislation, shall be authorized to acquire, possess or manage only the necessary assets to achieve their objectives."

The first paragraph of Article 130 stated: "The rules established at this article are guided by the historical principle according to which the State and the churches are separated entities from each other. Churches and religious congregations shall be organized under the law."

The Constitution also provided for mandatory registration of all churches and religious congregations and forbade priests to involve themselves in politics or inherit from anyone other than close relatives. It also allowed each state to control the number of priests in its territory (some reduced it to zero), forbade the wearing of religious garb outside of church premises, and excluded offenders from a trial by jury. Carranza declared himself opposed to the final draft of Articles 3, 5, 24, 27, 123 and 130, but the Constitutional Congress contained only 85 conservatives and centrists who were close to Carranza's moderate liberalism. Against them were 132 delegates of a more radical and anticlerical mindset.

Article 24 stated: "Every man shall be free to choose and profess any religious belief as long as it is lawful and it cannot be punished under criminal law. The Congress shall not be authorized to enact laws either establishing or prohibiting a particular religion. Religious ceremonies of public nature shall be ordinarily performed at the temples. Those performed outdoors shall be regulated under the law."

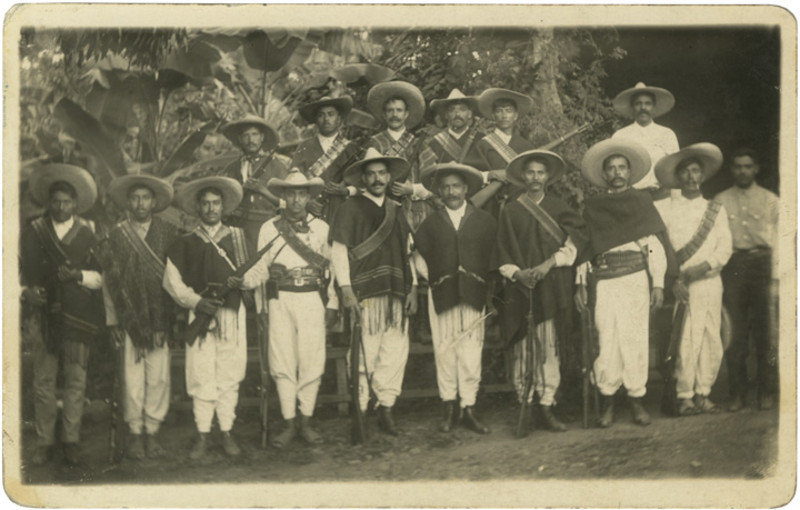
Group of Cristero generals posing in Coalcomán, Michoacán, circa 1927 during the Cristero War.

=== Conflict between church and state ===
The Mexican Revolution was the costliest conflict in the history of Mexico. The overthrow of the dictator Porfirio Díaz caused political instability, with many contending factions and regions. The Mexican Catholic Church and the Díaz government had come to an informal modus vivendi in which the state formally maintained the anticlerical articles of the liberal Constitution of 1857 but failed to enforce them. A change of leadership and a wholesale overturning of the previous order were potential sources of danger to the Church's position. In the democratizing wave of political activity, the National Catholic Party (Partido Católico Nacional) was formed.

After President Francisco I. Madero was overthrown and assassinated in the February 1913 military coup, which was led by General Victoriano Huerta, supporters of the Porfirian regime were returned to their posts. After the ouster of Huerta in 1914, members of the National Catholic Party and high-ranking Church figures were accused of collaborating with the Huerta regime, and the Catholic Church was subjected to revolutionary hostilities and fierce anticlericalism by many northern revolutionaries. The Constitutionalist faction won the revolution and its leader, Venustiano Carranza, had a new constitution drawn up, the Constitution of 1917. It strengthened the anticlerical provisions of the previous document, but President Carranza and his successor, General Alvaro Obregón, were preoccupied by their struggles against their enemies in Mexico and so they were lenient in their enforcement of the Constitution's anticlerical articles, especially in areas in which the Church was powerful.

Carranza was the first president under the 1917 Constitution but he was overthrown by his former ally Álvaro Obregón in 1919. Obregón took over the presidency in late 1920 and effectively applied the Constitution's anticlerical laws in areas in which the Church was fragile. The uneasy truce with the Church ended with Obregón's 1924 handpicked succession of the atheist Plutarco Elías Calles. Mexican "Jacobins", supported by Calles's central government, engaged in secularization campaigns to eradicate what they called superstition and fanaticism, which included the desecration of religious objects as well as the persecution and the murder of members of the clergy.

When Calles and his Labor Party came to power in 1924, the administration believed that the Church was challenging its revolutionary initiatives and legal basis. The administration thus resolved for strict enforcement of the Constitution's secularist articles. To confront the Church's influence, laws were brought into force to execute on the constitutional provisions, which triggered a ten-year-long religious conflict in which thousands of armed civilians were killed by the Mexican Army. Some have characterized Calles as the leader of an atheist state and his program as being one to eradicate religion in Mexico, but Calles also supported the creation of the Mexican Catholic Apostolic Church in 1925, a national church independent from the Vatican and accepting of the secularist Constitution.

Calles applied the anticlerical laws stringently throughout the country and added his own anticlerical legislation. In June 1926, he signed the "Law for Reforming the Penal Code," which was popularly called the Calles Law. It provided specific penalties for priests and individuals who violated the provisions of the 1917 Constitution. For instance, wearing clerical garb in public, outside church buildings, earned a fine of 500 pesos (then the equivalent of US$250), and priests who criticized the government could be imprisoned for five years. Some states enacted their own anticlerical measures. Chihuahua enacted a law permitting only one priest to serve all Catholics in the state. To help enforce the law, Calles expropriated church property, expelled all foreign priests and closed monasteries, convents and religious schools.

=== Protests and radicalization ===
In response to the measures, Catholic organizations began to intensify their resistance. The most important Catholic group was the National League for the Defense of Religious Liberty, founded in 1924, which was joined by the Mexican Association of Catholic Youth, founded in 1913, and the Popular Union, a Catholic political party founded the previous year.

Later in 1926, Calles intensified tensions against the clergy by ordering all local churches in and around Jalisco to be bolted shut. The places of worship remained shut for two years. On 14 July, Catholic bishops endorsed plans for an economic boycott against the government, which was particularly effective in west-central Mexico (the states of Jalisco, Michoacán, Guanajuato, Aguascalientes, and Zacatecas). Other states that saw minor uprising were Oaxaca, Colima, Sonora, and Nayarit. Catholics in those areas stopped attending movies and plays and using public transportation, and Catholic teachers stopped teaching in secular schools.

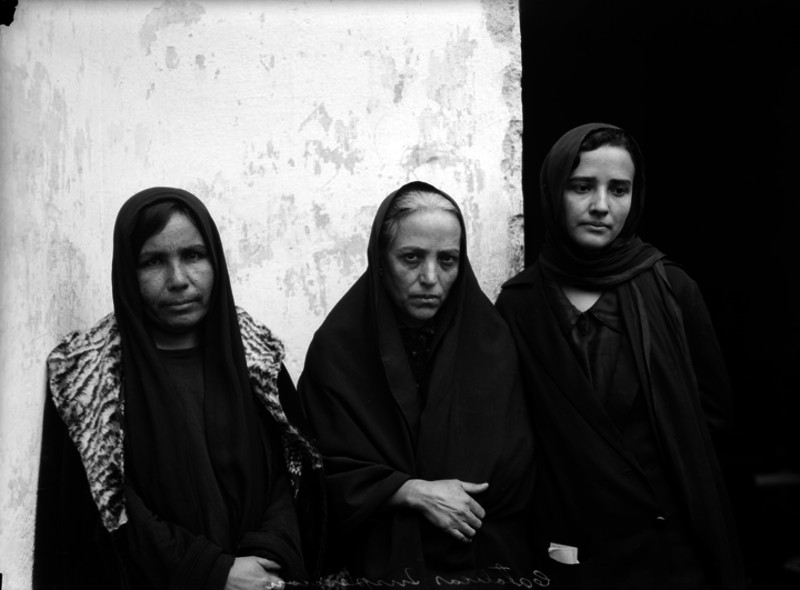
Suspects affiliated with the National League for the Defense of Religious Liberty at the police inspection.

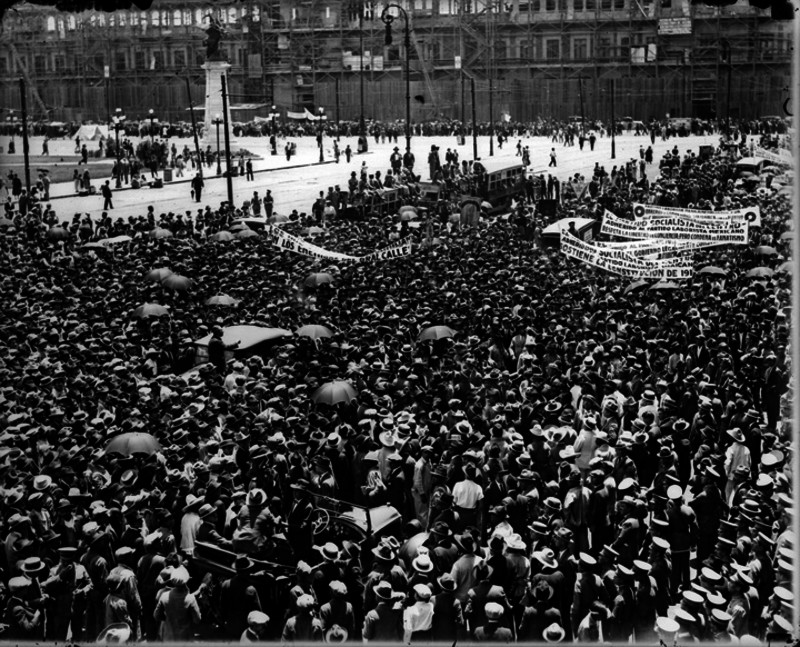
The photograph titled "Manifestaciones católicas" was taken, during a key period in Mexican history marked by growing tensions between the government of Plutarco Elías Calles and the Catholic Church. The image shows a Catholic demonstration in Mexico City, a significant event due to the restrictions imposed on the Church under the Calles Law, which provoked a strong response from the religious community.

The fomenting conflict attracted the attention of Pope Pius XI, who issued a series of papal encyclicals from 1925 to 1937. On 18 November 1926, he issued Iniquis afflictisque ("On the Persecution of the Church in Mexico") to denounce the violent anticlerical persecution in Mexico. Despite the government's promises, the persecution of the Church continued. In response, Pius issued Acerba animi on 29 September 1932.

The bishops asked to have the offending articles of the Constitution amended. Pope Pius XI explicitly approved the plan. The Calles government considered the bishops' activism to be sedition and had many more churches closed. In September 1926, the episcopate submitted a proposal to amend the Constitution, but the Mexican Congress rejected it on 22 September.

A modern reproduction of the flag used by the Cristeros with references to "Viva Cristo rey" and "Nuestra señora de Guadalupe"

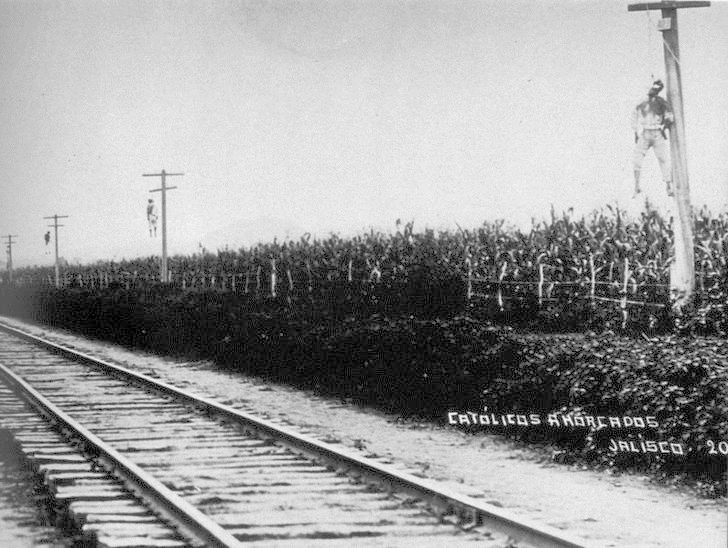
Government forces publicly hanged Cristeros on main thoroughfares throughout Mexico, including in the Pacific states of Colima and Jalisco, where bodies often remained hanging for extended lengths of time.

== Rebellion ==
The government called the rebels Cristeros since they invoked the name of Jesus Christ under the title of "Cristo Rey" or Christ the King, and the rebels soon took to using the name themselves. The rebellion is known for the Feminine Brigades of St. Joan of Arc, a brigade of women that assisted the rebels in smuggling guns and ammunition, and for certain priests, who were tortured and murdered in public and later canonized by Pope John Paul II. The rebellion eventually came to an end following a settlement brokered by the Ambassador Dwight W. Morrow with financial relief and logistical assistance provided by the Knights of Columbus.

=== Beginning of violence ===
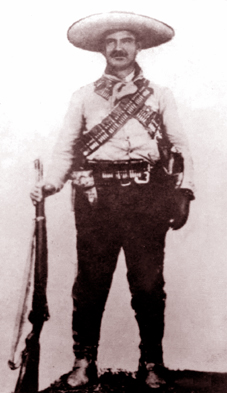
Cristero Victoriano Ramírez

On 3 August, four days after the Calles Law came into force, in Guadalajara, Jalisco, some 400 armed Catholics shut themselves in the Church of Our Lady of Guadalupe ("Santuario de Nuestra Señora de Guadalupe"). They exchanged gunfire with federal troops and surrendered when they ran out of ammunition. According to American consular sources, the battle resulted in 18 dead and 40 wounded. The following day, in Sahuayo, Michoacán, 240 government soldiers stormed the parish church. The priest and his vicar were killed in the ensuing violence.

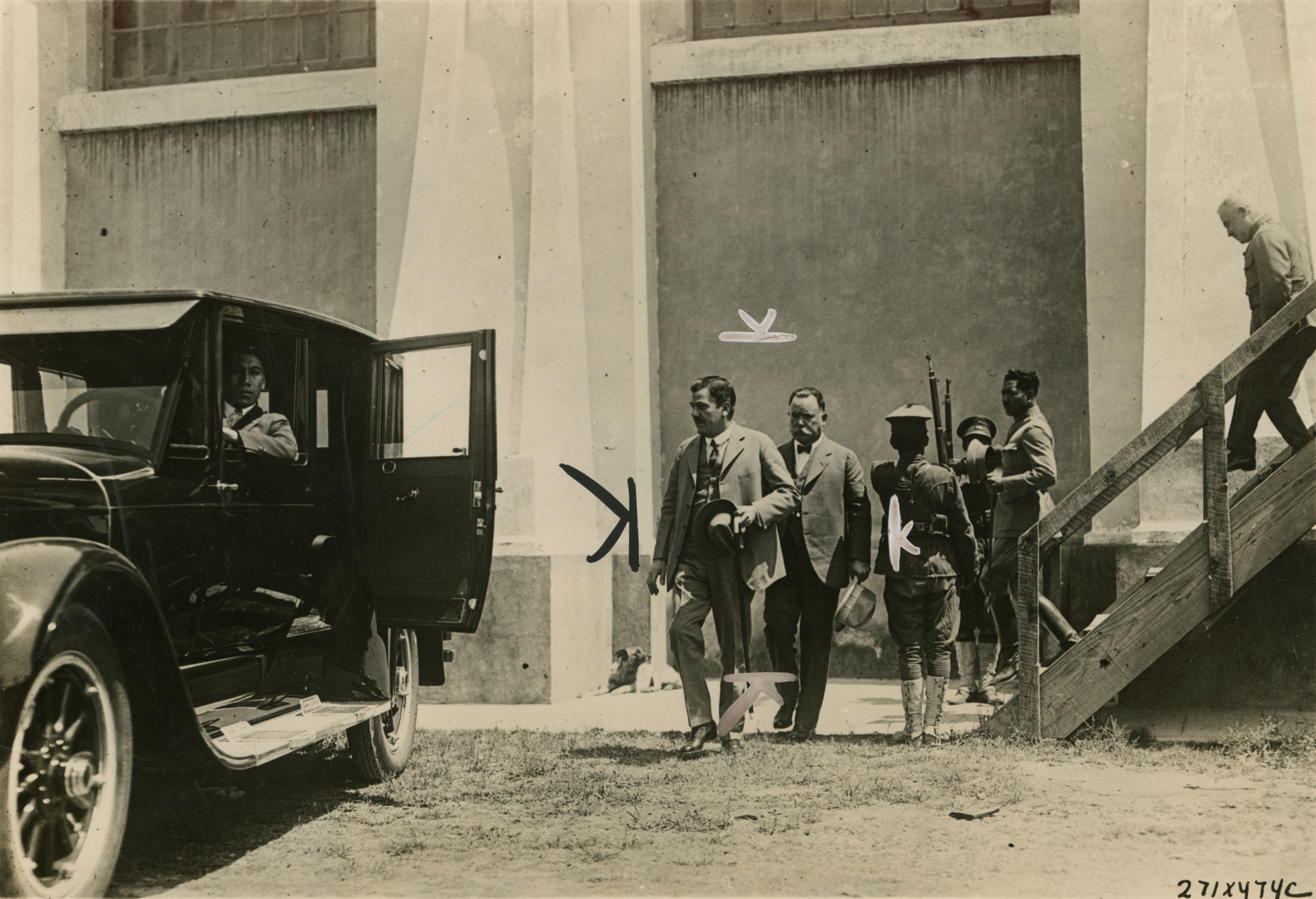
President Calles leaving military headquarters after inspecting troops in preparation of the upcoming revolts

On 14 August, government agents staged a purge of the Chalchihuites, Zacatecas, chapter of the Association of Catholic Youth and executed its spiritual adviser, Father Luis Bátiz Sainz. The execution caused a band of ranchers, led by Pedro Quintanar, to seize the local treasury and to declare themselves in rebellion. At the height of the rebellion, they held a region including the entire northern part of Jalisco. Luis Navarro Origel, mayor of Pénjamo, Guanajuato, led another uprising on 28 September. His men were defeated by federal troops in the open land around the town but retreated into the mountains, where they engaged in guerrilla warfare. In support of the two guerrilla Apache clans, the Chavez and Trujillos helped smuggle arms, munitions, and supplies from the US state of New Mexico.

That was followed by a 29 September uprising in Durango, led by Trinidad Mora, and a 4 October rebellion in southern Guanajuato, led by former General Rodolfo Gallegos. Both rebel leaders adopted guerrilla tactics since their forces were no match for federal troops. Meanwhile, rebels in Jalisco, particularly the region northeast of Guadalajara, quietly began assembling forces. Led by 27-year-old René Capistrán Garza, the leader of the Mexican Association of Catholic Youth, the region would become the main focal point of the rebellion.

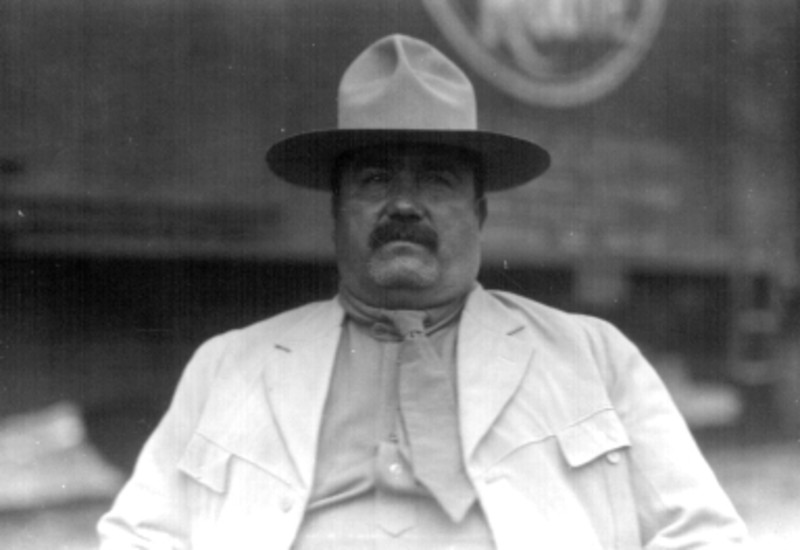
A portrait of Rodolfo Gallegos, a key leader of the Cristero movement during the Mexican Cristero War (1926–1929).

The formal rebellion began on 1 January 1927 with a manifesto sent by Garza, A la Nación ("To the Nation"). It declared that "the hour of battle has sounded" and that "the hour of victory belongs to God." With the declaration, the state of Jalisco, which had been seemingly quiet since the Guadalajara church uprising, exploded. Bands of rebels moving in the "Los Altos" region northeast of Guadalajara began seizing villages and were often armed with only ancient muskets and clubs. The rebels had scarce logistical supplies and relied heavily on the Feminine Brigades of St. Joan of Arc and raids on towns, trains, and ranches to supply themselves with money, horses, ammunition, and food. By contrast, the Calles government was supplied with arms and ammunition by the American government later in the war. In at least one battle, American pilots provided air support for the Federal Army against the Cristero rebels.

The Calles government failed at first to take the threat seriously. The rebels did well against the agraristas, a rural militia recruited throughout Mexico, and the Social Defense forces, the local militia, but were at first always defeated by regular federal troops, who guarded the main cities. The Federal Army then had 79,759 men. When the Jalisco federal commander, General Jesús Ferreira, moved in on the rebels, he wired to army headquarters that "it will be less a campaign than a hunt." That sentiment was held also by Calles.

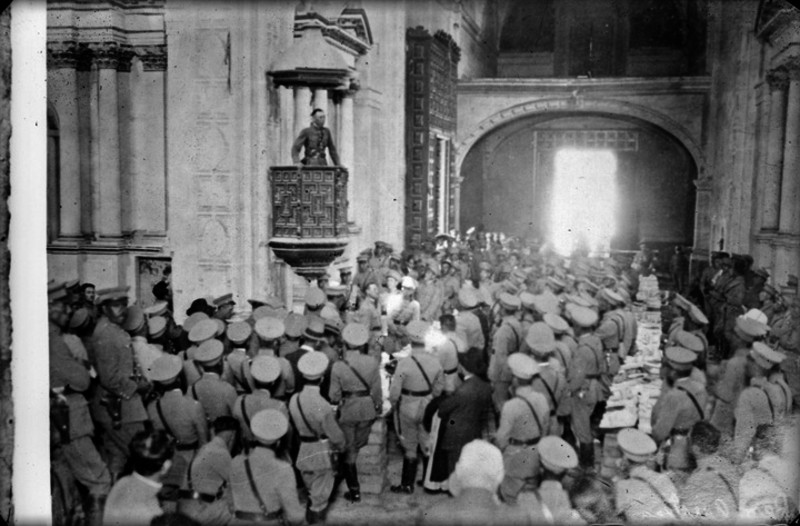
A government soldier uses the pulpit of the Church of San Joaquín to offer a banquet in honor of General Amaro during the Cristero War.

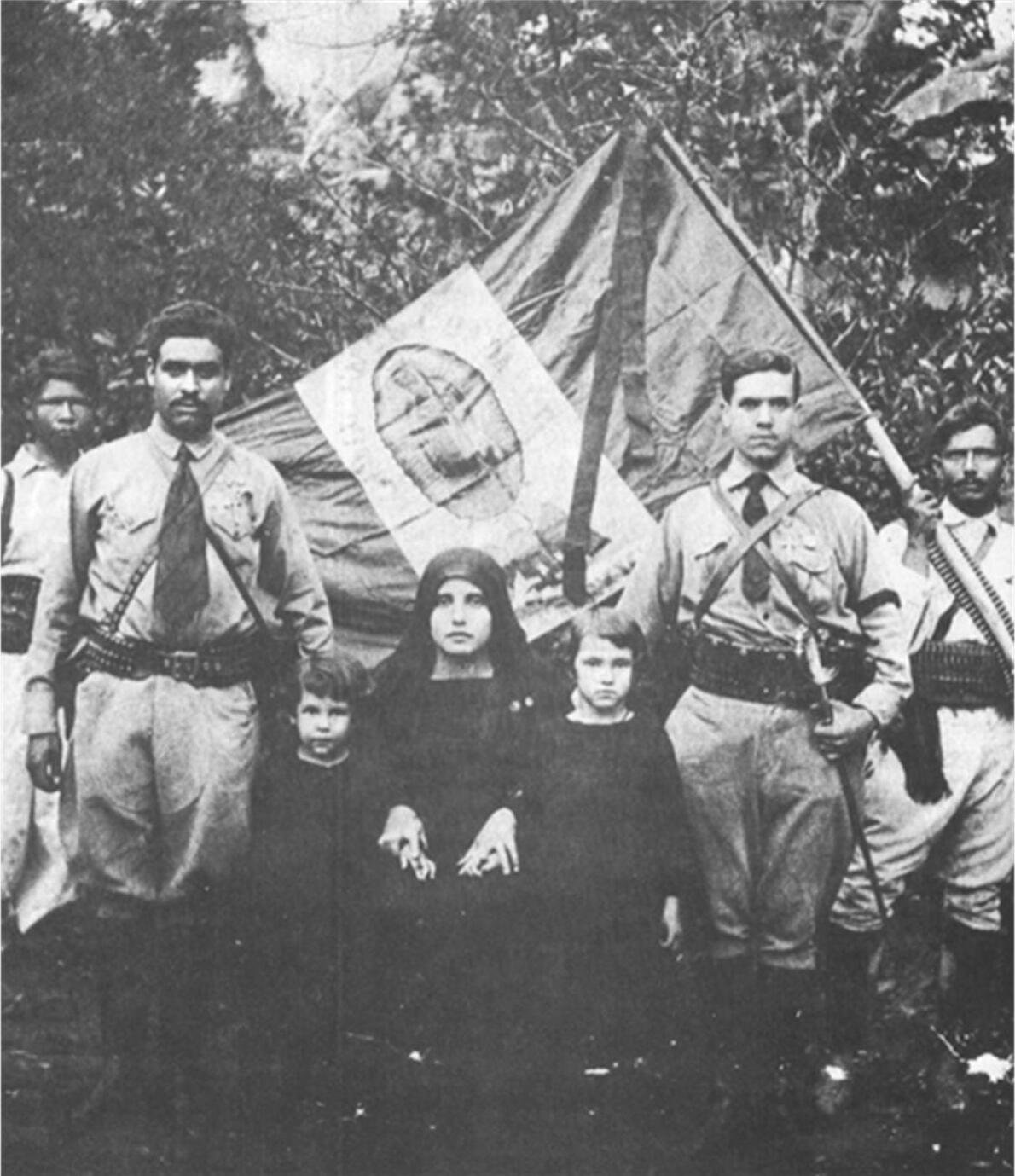
A photo of officers and family members from the Cristeros Castañón fighting regiment.

However, the rebels planned their battles fairly well, especially when it is considered that most of them had little to no previous military experience. The most successful rebel leaders were Jesús Degollado, a pharmacist; Victoriano Ramírez, a ranch hand; and two priests, Aristeo Pedroza and José Reyes Vega. Reyes Vega was renowned, and Cardinal Davila deemed him a "black-hearted assassin". At least five priests took up arms, and many others supported them in various ways.

Many of the rebel peasants who took up arms in the fight had different motivations from the Catholic Church. Many were still fighting for agrarian land reform, which had been years earlier the focal point of the Mexican Revolution. The peasantry was still upset of the usurpation of its rightful title to the land.

The Mexican episcopate never officially supported the rebellion, but the rebels had some indications that their cause was legitimate. Bishop José Francisco Orozco of Guadalajara remained with the rebels. Although he formally rejected armed rebellion, he was unwilling to leave his flock.

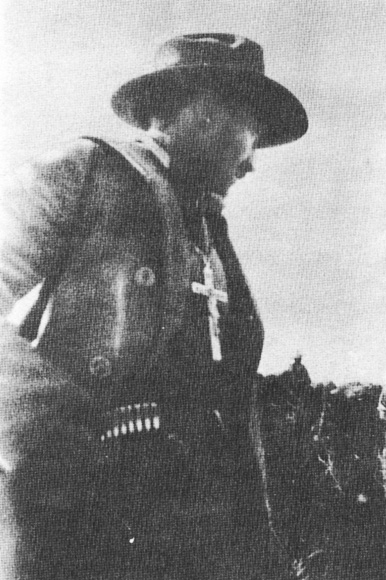
Cristero General Enrique Gorostieta.

On 23 February 1927, the Cristeros defeated federal troops for the first time at San Francisco del Rincón, Guanajuato, followed by another victory at San Julián, Jalisco. However, they quickly began to lose in the face of superior federal forces, retreated into remote areas, and constantly fled federal soldiers. Most of the leadership of the revolt in the state of Jalisco was forced to flee to the U.S. although Ramírez and Vega remained.

In April 1927, the leader of the civilian wing of the Cristiada, Anacleto González Flores, was captured, tortured, and killed. The media and the government declared victory, and plans were made for a re-education campaign in the areas that had rebelled. As if to prove that the rebellion was not extinguished and to avenge his death, Vega led a raid against a train carrying a shipment of money for the Bank of Mexico on 19 April 1927. The raid was a success, but Vega's brother was killed in the fighting.

The "Reconcentración" policy, was a policy of forced resettlement by the government during the cristero period of villages destroyed during the numerous battles . rather than suppressing the revolt, gave it new life, as thousands of men began to aid and join the rebels in resentment for their treatment by the government. When rains came, the peasants were allowed to return to the harvest, and there was now more support than ever for the Cristeros. By August 1927, they had consolidated their movement and had begun constant attacks on federal troops garrisoned in their towns. They would soon be joined by Enrique Gorostieta, a retired general hired by the National League for the Defense of Religious Liberty.

On 21 June 1927, the first Women's Brigade was formed in Zapopan. It began with 16 women and one man, but after a few days, it grew to 135 members and soon came to number 17,000. Its mission was to obtain money, weapons, provisions, and information for the combatant men and to care for the wounded. By March 1928, some 10,000 women were involved in the struggle, with many smuggling weapons into combat zones by carrying them in carts filled with grain or cement. By the end of the war, it numbered some 25,000. Several female Catholic activists groups formed during this time, and women were instrumental in the formation of activist groups to promote a movement in response to the anticlerical campaigns of the period.

With close ties to the Church and the clergy, the De La Torre family was instrumental in bringing the Cristero Movement to northern Mexico. The family, originally from Zacatecas and Guanajuato, moved to Aguascalientes and then, in 1922, to San Luis Potosí. It moved again to Tampico for economic reasons and finally to Nogales (both the Mexican city and its similarly named sister city across the border in Arizona) to escape persecution from authorities because of its involvement in the Church and the rebels. The Cristeros maintained the upper hand throughout 1928, and in 1929, the government faced a new crisis: a revolt within army ranks that was led by Arnulfo R. Gómez in Veracruz. The Cristeros tried to take advantage by a failed attack on Guadalajara in late March 1929. The rebels managed to take Tepatitlán on 19 April, but Vega was killed. The rebellion was met with equal force, and the Cristeros were soon facing divisions within their own ranks. Another difficulty facing the Cristeros and especially the Catholic Church was the extended period without a place of worship. The clergy faced the fear of driving away the faithful masses by engaging in war for so long. They also lacked the overwhelming sympathy or support from many aspects of Mexican society, even among many Catholics.

=== Diplomacy ===
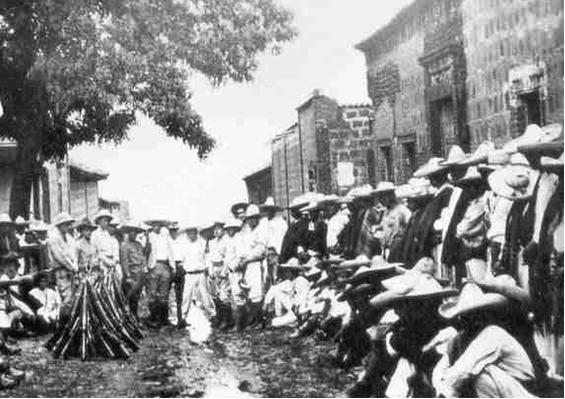
Armed Cristeros congregating in the streets of Mexico.

In October 1927, the American ambassador, Dwight Morrow, initiated a series of breakfast meetings with Calles at which they would discuss a range of issues from the religious uprising to oil and irrigation. That earned him the nickname "the ham and eggs diplomat" in U.S. papers. Morrow wanted the conflict to end for regional security and to help find a solution to the oil problem in the U.S. He was aided in his efforts by Father John J. Burke of the National Catholic Welfare Conference. Calles's term as president was coming to an end, and ex-President Álvaro Obregón had been elected president and was scheduled to take office on 1 December 1928. Obregón had been more lenient to Catholics during his time in office than Calles, but it was also generally accepted among Mexicans, including the Cristeros, that Calles was his puppet leader. Two weeks after his election, Obregón was assassinated by a Catholic radical, José de León Toral, which gravely damaged the peace process but was seen as a political victory by the Cristeros.

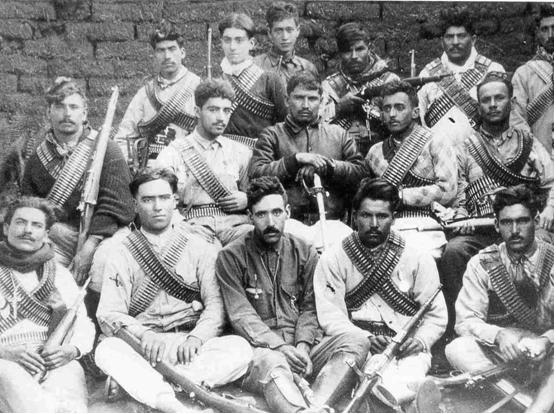
Cristeros of San Jose de Garcia, Michoacán in the center with the sword is colonel Anatolio Partida to his left is Honorato Gonzalez

In September 1928, Congress named Emilio Portes Gil as interim president with a special election to be held in November 1929. Portes was more open to the Church than Calles had been and allowed Morrow and Burke to restart the peace initiative. Portes told a foreign correspondent on 1 May 1929, that "the Catholic clergy, when they wish, may renew the exercise of their rites with only one obligation, that they respect the laws of the land." The next day, the exiled Archbishop Leopoldo Ruíz y Flores issued a statement that the bishops would not demand the repeal of the laws but only their more lenient enforcement.

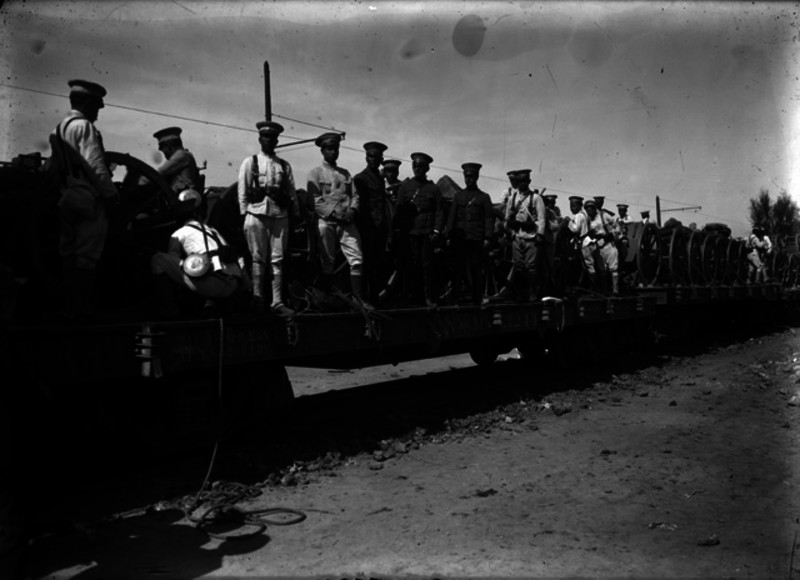
The photograph "Tropas federales salen a combatir a los cristeros", taken by Agustín Casasola in 1927, depicts federal troops preparing to engage in battle against the Cristeros during the Cristero War in Mexico. This powerful image captures a significant moment of military mobilization amidst the religious conflict that defined much of the era.

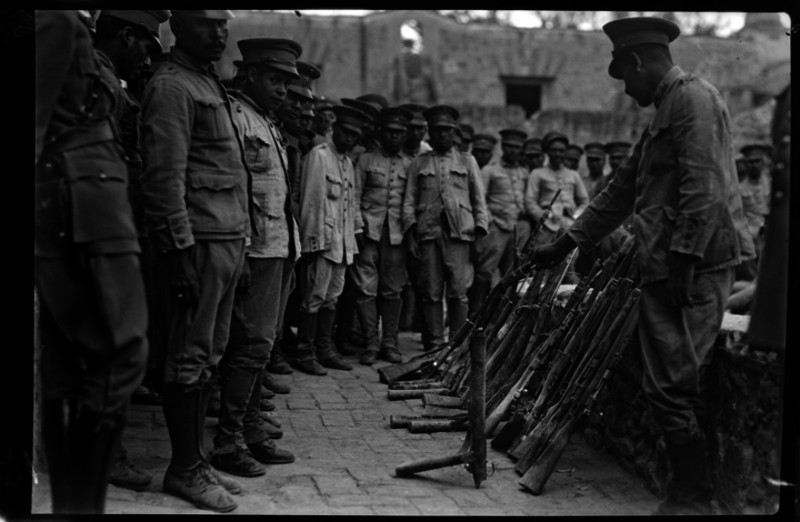
Federal troops inspect their weapons during the Cristero War in Mexico City,

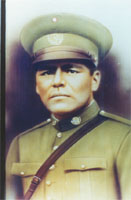
Mexican Army General Heliodoro Charis.

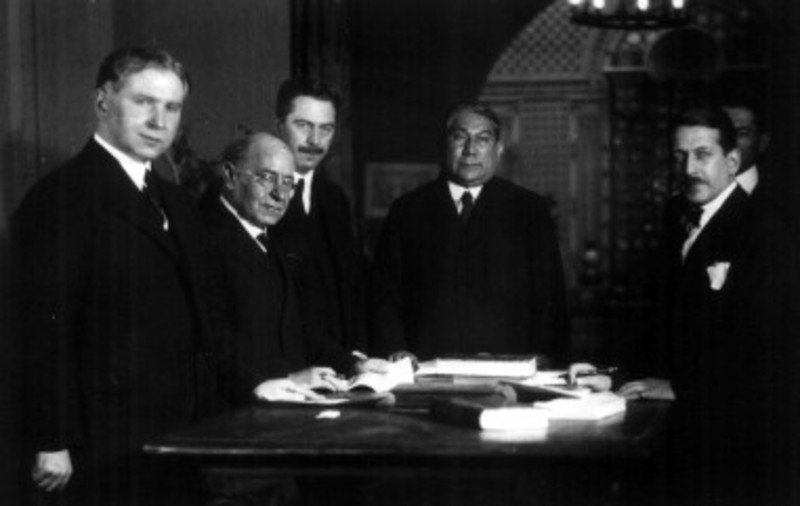
Archbishop Leopoldo Ruiz y Flores, Bishop (later Archbishop) Pascual Díaz y Barreto, U.S. Ambassador Dwight W. Morrow, Chilean diplomat Miguel Cruchaga, and Mexican Ambassador Manuel C. Téllez gathered in Washington, D.C., during negotiations to resolve the religious conflict in Mexico, 1929.

Morrow managed to bring the parties to agreement on 21 June 1929. His office drafted a pact called the arreglos ("agreement"), which allowed worship to resume in Mexico and granted three concessions to the Catholics. Only priests who were named by hierarchical superiors would be required to register; religious instruction in churches but not in schools would be permitted; and all citizens, including the clergy, would be allowed to make petitions to reform the laws. However, the most important parts of the agreement were that the Church would recover the right to use its properties, and priests would recover their rights to live on the properties. Legally speaking, the Church was not allowed to own real estate, and its former facilities remained federal property. However, the Church effectively took control over the properties. In the convenient arrangement for both parties, the Church ostensibly ended its support for the rebels.

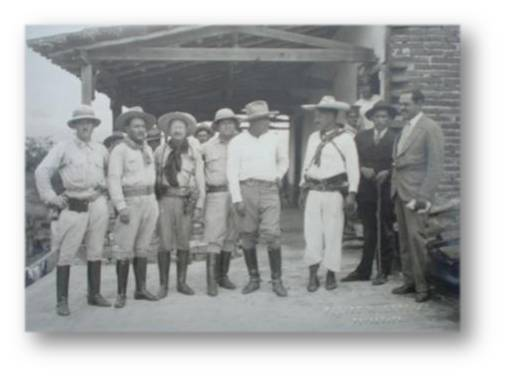
Cristeros bosses interview and the head of Military Operations of the State of Colima on 21 June 1929.

Over the previous two years, anticlerical officers, who were hostile to the federal government for reasons other than its position on religion, had joined the rebels. When the agreement between the government and the Church was made known, only a minority of the rebels went home, mainly those who felt their battle had been won. On the other hand, since the rebels themselves had not been consulted in the talks, many felt betrayed, and some continued to fight. The Church threatened those rebels with excommunication and the rebellion gradually died out. The officers, fearing that they would be tried as traitors, tried to keep the rebellion alive. Their attempt failed, and many were captured and shot, and others escaped to San Luis Potosí, where General Saturnino Cedillo gave them refuge.

The war had claimed the lives of some 90,000 people: 56,882 federals, 30,000 Cristeros, and numerous civilians and Cristeros who were killed in anticlerical raids after the war had ended. As promised by Portes Gil, the Calles Law remained on the books, but there were no organized federal attempts to enforce it. Nonetheless, in several localities, officials continued persecution of Catholic priests, based on their interpretation of the law.

In 1992, the Mexican government amended the constitution by granting all religious groups legal status, conceding them property rights, and lifting restrictions on the number of priests in the country.

=== American involvement ===
==== Mexican-American resistance ====
While the war was raging on in Mexico, Cristero exiles and other Mexican immigrants and refugees would attend sermons by banished Cristero priests denouncing President Plutarco Elías Calles' regime and the Cristero War. The attendees would also help generate sympathy in the United States for the Cristero War by printing newspaper articles about the war and would create religious nationalistic organizations such as Unión Nacionalista Mexicana (Nationalist Mexican's Union) to gather funds for the war effort. There were some within these groups that would contribute more military aid to the Cristeros, with actions including smuggling arms across the Mexican-American border, providing espionage against the Mexican government, recruiting new troops to aid the Cristeros, and inciting armed revolts within Mexico. Despite all of these efforts, their contribution to the war was largely limited because of distrust from the US government, which considered that an armed Catholic movement was dangerous; would send more troops to the border; and would then cause more persecution and discrimination to Mexican Catholics, Cristero exiles, and refugees.

==== Knights of Columbus ====
Created in New Haven, Connecticut in 1882, the Knights of Columbus would establish its first chapter in Mexico called Caballeros de Colón (Knights of Columbus in Spanish) in Mexico City in 1905. Established by California railroad mogul and Knight John B. Frisbie, a resident of Mexico City, the first chapter would be made up of mostly Irish and Irish-Mexicans before more Mexicans would join the organization. The Knights of Columbus would eventually become one of Mexico's biggest and most monumental Catholic organizations, with a total of 5,102 members across 45 councils nationwide. The Knights of Columbus would start out in western states, an area where the Catholic Church was widespread, such as Puebla, Hidalgo, Michoacán, Guanajuato, and Jalisco, before spreading to Nayarit, Veracruz, Coahuila, Durango, and Chihuahua. Mexican members of the Knights of Columbus would also be involved with other Catholic organizations such as the Young Men's Catholic Association and La Liga Nacional Defensora de la Libertad Religiosa (National League for the Defense of Religious Liberty in English). The Knights of Columbus would create religious schools throughout Mexico in 1923 as a way to create a "National Crusade in Defense of Catholicism". Furthermore, La Liga would create a popular, nationwide boycott in 1925 to protest the government's treatment of Catholics and the ongoing anti-religious sentiment present throughout the government. The Knights of Columbus also helped to generate propaganda and support for the Cristero War, framing the war as a story of martyrs and heroes, standing up for their religion in the face of an oppressive government.

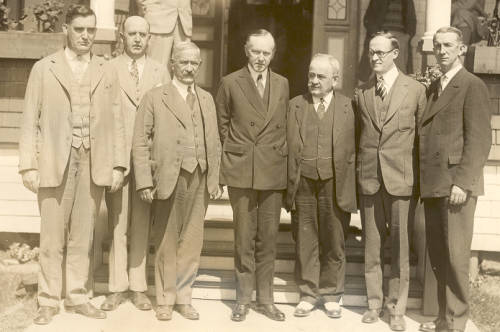
President Coolidge with the Knights of Columbus delegates who called upon him to seek government aid for the program for relief of the Catholics in Mexico. Left to right in the group are Luke E. Hart; Martin H. Carmody; Supreme Knight James A. Flaherty; President Coolidge; William J. McGinley; W.C. Prout; and John S. Conway

American and Mexican councils, most of which were newly formed, of the Knights of Columbus opposed the persecution by the Mexican government. So far, nine of those who were beatified or canonized were Knights. The American Knights collected more than $1 million to assist exiles from Mexico, fund the continuation of the education of expelled seminarians, and inform U.S. citizens about the oppression. They circulated five million leaflets about the war in the United States, held hundreds of lectures, spread the news via radio, and paid to "smuggle" a friendly journalist, Francis McCullagh, into Mexico so he could cover the war for an American audience.

In addition to lobbying the American public, the Knights met United States President Calvin Coolidge and pressed him for US intervention on behalf of the rebels. According to former Supreme Knight of the Knights of Columbus, Carl A. Anderson, two thirds of Mexican Catholic councils were shut down by the Mexican government. In response, the Knights of Columbus published posters and magazines which presented Cristero soldiers in a positive light. In the mid-1920s, the anti-Catholic Ku Klux Klan denounced the Knights of Columbus's Mexican Fund.

== Aftermath ==
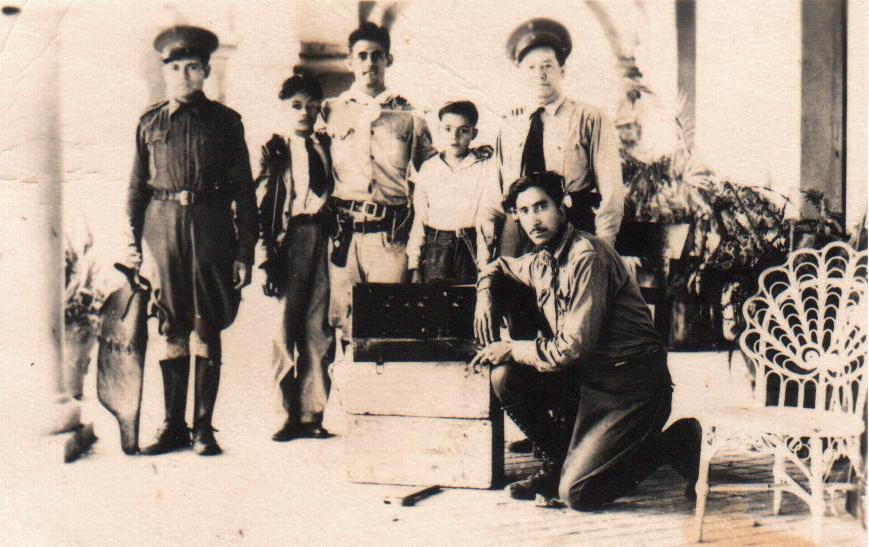
Amnesty with the Federal Army in San Gabriel, Jalisco, under Manuel Michel.

The government often did not abide by the terms of the truce. For example, it executed some 500 Cristero leaders and 5,000 other Cristeros. Catholics continued to oppose Calles's insistence on a state monopoly on education, which suppressed Catholic education and introduced secular education in its place: "We must enter and take possession of the mind of childhood, the mind of youth." Calles's military persecution of Cristeros after the truce would be officially condemned by Mexican President Lázaro Cárdenas and the Mexican Congress in 1935. Between 1935 and 1936, Cárdenas had Calles and many of his close associates arrested and forced them into exile soon afterwards. Freedom of worship was no longer suppressed, but some states refused to repeal Calles's policy. Relations with the Church improved under President Cárdenas.

The government's disregard for the Church, however, did not relent until 1940, when President Manuel Ávila Camacho, a practicing Catholic, took office. During Cárdenas presidency, Church buildings in the country continued in the hands of the Mexican government, and the nation's policies regarding the Church still fell into federal jurisdiction. Under Camacho, bans against Church anticlerical laws were no longer enforced anywhere in Mexico.

The effects of the war on the Church were profound. Between 1926 and 1934, at least 40 priests were killed. There were 4,500 priests serving the people before the rebellion, but by 1934, there were only 334 licensed by the government to serve 15 million Catholics. The rest had been eliminated by emigration, expulsion, assassination, or not obtaining licenses. In 1935, 17 states had no registered priests.

The end of the Cristero War affected emigration to the United States. "In the aftermath of their defeat, many of the Cristeros – by some estimates as much as 5 percent of Mexico's population – fled to the United States. Many of them made their way to Los Angeles, where they were received by John Joseph Cantwell, bishop of what was then the Los Angeles-San Diego diocese." Under Archbishop Cantwell's sponsorship, the Cristero refugees became a substantial community in Los Angeles, California, in 1934 staging a parade some 40,000-strong throughout the city. Additionally, several other cities received the immigrants, such as Chicago, Illinois, Milwaukee, Wisconsin, and San Antonio, Texas. Many cities saw an increase in Mexican Catholics fleeing because of the war. Immigration to other countries such as Canada, Italy, and Cuba occurred as well.

=== Cárdenas era ===
The Calles Law was repealed after Cárdenas became president in 1934. Cárdenas earned respect from Pope Pius XI and befriended Mexican Archbishop Luis María Martínez, a major figure in Mexico's Catholic Church who successfully persuaded Mexicans to obey the government's laws peacefully. The Church refused to back the Mexican insurgent Saturnino Cedillo, who attempted a revolt against Cárdenas although Cedillo endorsed more power for the Church.

Cárdenas's government continued to suppress religion in the field of education during his administration. The Mexican Congress amended Article 3 of the Constitution in October 1934 to include the following introductory text: "The education imparted by the State shall be a socialist one and, in addition to excluding all religious doctrine, shall combat fanaticism and prejudices by organizing its instruction and activities in a way that shall permit the creation in youth of an exact and rational concept of the Universe and of social life."

The implementation of socialist education met with strong opposition in some parts of academia and in areas that had been controlled by the Cristeros. Pope Pius XI also published the encyclical Firmissimam constantiam on 28 March 1937, expressing his opposition to the "impious and corruptive school" (paragraph 22) and his support for Catholic Action in Mexico. That was the third and last encyclical published by Pius XI that referred to the religious situation in Mexico. The amendment was ignored by President Manuel Ávila Camacho and was officially repealed from the Constitution in 1946. Constitutional bans against the Church would not be enforced anywhere in Mexico during Camacho's presidency.

==== Cristeros' targeted violence against government forces and public school teachers ====
Many former Cristeros took up arms again and fought as independent rebels, and some Catholics joined them. They targeted unarmed public school teachers, who implemented secular education, and committed atrocities against them. Government supporters blamed the atrocities on the Cristeros in general. Some of the teachers who were paid by the government refused to leave their schools and communities and so sustained mutilations when Cristeros cut their ears off. Thus, the teachers who were murdered during the conflict are frequently referred to as maestros desorejados ("teachers without ears").

In some cases, teachers were tortured and killed by former Cristero rebels. It is calculated that approximately 300 rural teachers were killed between 1935 and 1939, and other authors calculate that at least 223 teachers were victims of the violence which occurred between 1931 and 1940, the acts of violence which occurred during this period included the assassinations of Carlos Sayago, Carlos Pastraña, and Librado Labastida in Teziutlán, Puebla, the hometown of President Manuel Ávila Camacho; the execution of a teacher, Carlos Toledano, who was burned alive in Tlapacoyan, Veracruz; and the lynching of at least 42 teachers in the state of Michoacán.

President Lázaro Cárdenas with rural schoolteachers who were mutilated by Cristero groups during the continuing violence that followed the main phase of the Cristero War, c. 1935–1939.

==== Cristeros, priests and Catholic civilian victims of government violence ====
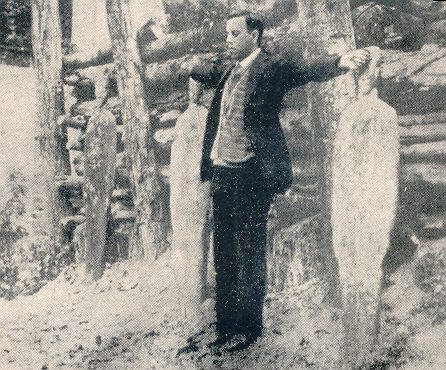
On 23 November 1927, Miguel Agustín Pro, a Mexican Jesuit, was executed by a firing squad in Mexico City.

The Catholic Church has recognized several of those who were killed in the Cristero War as martyrs. Among them are Miguel Pro, a Jesuit who was shot dead without trial by a firing squad on 23 November 1927 for his alleged involvement in an assassination attempt against former President Álvaro Obregón. His supporters maintained that he was executed for carrying out his priestly duties in defiance of the government. His beatification occurred in 1988.

On 21 May 2000, Pope John Paul II canonized a group of 25 martyrs who were killed during the Cristero War. They had been beatified on 22 November 1992. Of this group, 22 were secular clergy, and three were laymen. They did not take up arms themselves but refused to leave their flocks and ministries and were shot or hanged by government forces for offering the sacraments. Most were executed by federal forces. Although Pedro de Jesús Maldonado was killed in 1937, after the war had ended, he is considered a member of the Cristeros.

The Catholic Church recognized 13 additional victims of the war as martyrs on 20 November 2005, which paved the way for their beatifications. This group was mostly lay people, including Luis Magaña Servín and 14-year-old José Sánchez del Río. On 20 November 2005, at Jalisco Stadium in Guadalajara, José Saraiva Cardinal Martins celebrated the beatifications. Furthermore, some religious relics have been brought to the United States from Jalisco and are currently located at Our Lady of the Mount Church in Cicero, Illinois.

The war led refugees and exiles to flee to the United States, mostly from the central-Pacific region, as state-enforced violence towards Catholics led religious Mexicans from states such as Hidalgo, Jalisco, Michoacán, and Guanajuato also to leave for the United States. Within these new arrivals, there were 2,500 exiles with positions within the Catholic Church in Mexico, which created a Cristero Diaspora alongside other refugees, immigrants, and non-clergy exiles. Most of these refugees were also farmers, ranchers, and laborers, and the increased transportation services between the United States and Mexico made immigration easier than ever before. These immigrants would take industrial and labor-intensive jobs within the United States, particularly in California, Texas, Colorado, and New Mexico. This led to the creation of many churches and religious institutions in many states with Cristo Rey and Our Lady of Guadalupe as names, as well as to the building of seminaries to house displaced clergy members and several convents housing nuns .

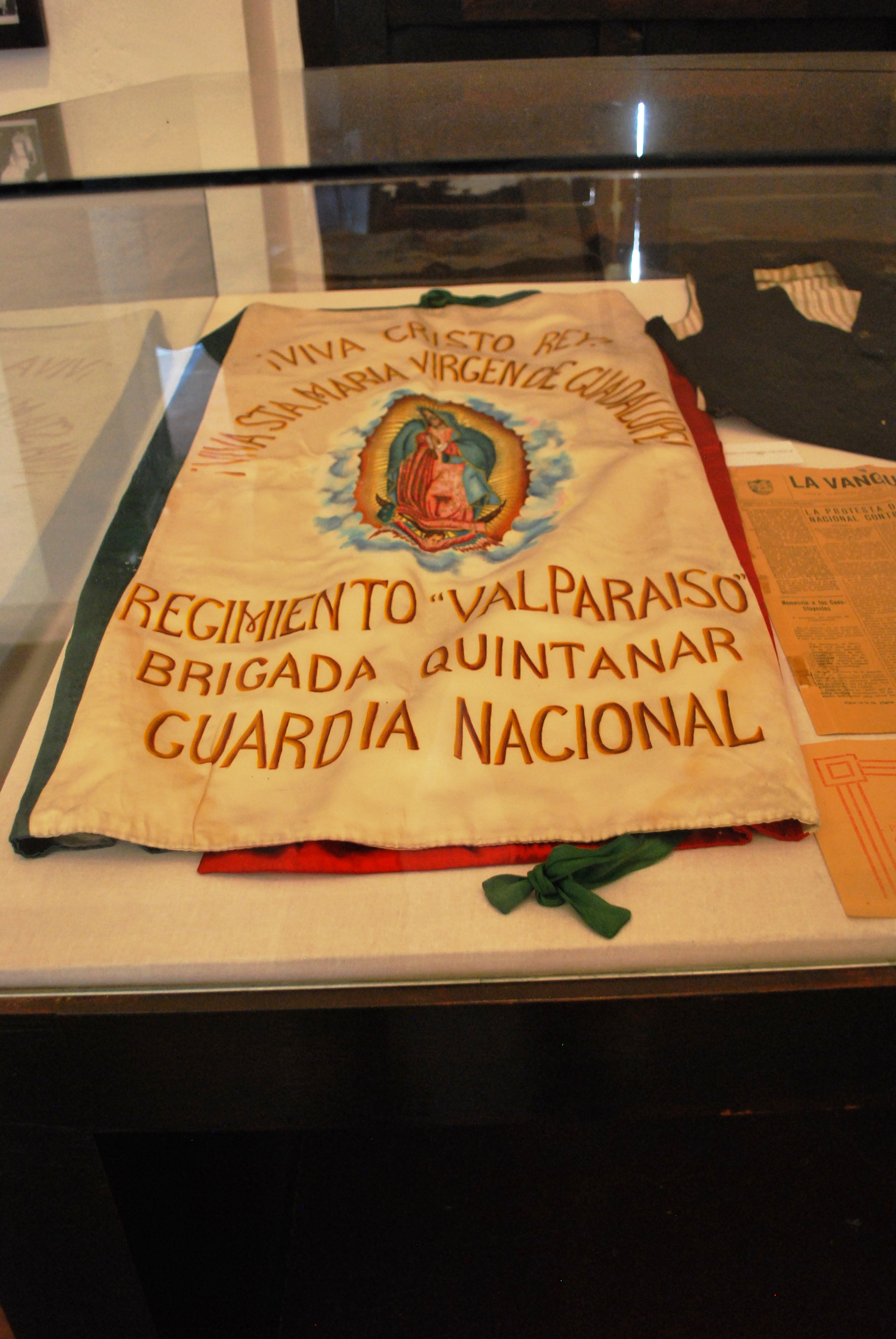
A banner from a group of Cristero supporters at the Centro de Estudios Cristeros in Encarnación de Díaz, Jalisco.

== In popular culture ==
The novel José Trigo by Fernando del Paso partly centers on the Cristero War. Graham Greene's 1940 novel The Power and the Glory deals with the Mexican government's attempt to suppress the Catholic Church during the war.

Many films, shorts, and documentaries about the war have been produced since 1929 such as Cristiada (aka For Greater Glory) from 2012.

Several ballads, or corridos, were composed in the period of the war by federal troops and Cristeros.

The Cristero War is also mentioned in the 1955 Juan Rulfo novel Pedro Páramo.

== See also ==
- Catholic Church in Latin America
- National Synarchist Union
- Kulturkampf
- List of wars involving Mexico
- Bajío (the main region of the rebellion)
- Reform War
- War in the Vendée and Chouannerie
- White Terror (Spain)

== Primary sources ==
Note: Many of the primary sources listed below were produced by individuals or institutions sympathetic to the Cristero cause. According to historian Julia Young, many Cristero era memoirs and accounts emphasize martyrdom and religious themes, reflecting devotional or ideological perspectives rather than detached historical analysis.

Textual sources

Aurelio Acevedo, ed. David: revista mensual ilustrada, historia cristera, información y civismo. 7 vols. Mexico, D.F.: Legión de Cristo Rey y Santa María de Guadalupe—veteranos de la Guardia Nacional Cristeros, 1952.

Bessières, Albert. Le Mexique Martyr. Paris: Maison de la bonne presse, 1928.

Chowell Martín. Luis Navarro Origel El Primer Cristero. Jus 1959.

Cardoso, Joaquín. Los mártires mexicanos: el martirologio católico de nuestros días. México: Buena Prensa, 1953. Internet Archive.

Dragon Antonio and Lawrence Drummond. 1930. Miguel Augustin Pro of the Society of Jesus : Martyr of Christ the King Executed in Mexico 23 November 1927. Montreal: Messenger Press. Internet Archive.

Mendoza Barragán Ezequiel. Testimonio Cristero : Memorias Del Autor. 1. ed. Editorial Jus 1990.

Degollado Guízar, Jesús. Memorias de Jesús Degollado Guízar, último general en jefe del ejército cristero. [1. ed.]. Colección de memorias, ser. A. México: Editorial Jús, 1957.

Galeria De Martires Mexicanos : Narraciones Veridicas. 1927. San Antonio Tex: Imprenta Universal.

Gorostieta, Luz María Pérez, and Juan Rodolfo Sánchez Gómez, eds. Cartas del General Enrique Gorostieta a Gertrudis Lasaga. Libros UANL. Libros UANL, 2013. https://libros.uanl.mx/index.php/u/catalog/book/51.

Navarrete Heriberto. Por Dios Y Por La Patria : Memorias De Mi Participación En La Defensa De La Libertad De Conciencia Y Culto Durante La Persecución Religiosa En México De 1926 a 1929. 1a. ed. Jus 1961.

Reguer, Consuelo. Dios y mi derecho: Año de 1932-Año de 1933-Situación de la Liga Nacional Defensora de la Libertad Segundo Levantamiento-Año de 1934 Año de 1935-Año de 1936-Ultimos años. 1. ed. Vol. 4. 4 vols. México: Editorial Jus, 1997.

Dios y mi derecho: Antecedentes-Epopeya Cristera-Clímax de la Epopeya Cristera Obispos-Boletines y Documentos. 1. ed. Vol. 1. 4 vols. México: Editorial Jus, 1997. Dios y mi derecho: Los Arreglos. (Primera parte)-Los Arreglos. (Segunda parte) Fin del año 1930-Año 1931-Educación. 1. ed. Vol. 3. 4 vols. México: Editorial Jus, 1997. Dios y mi derecho: Luis Segura Vilchis-Fusilamientos-Año 1927-Año 1928 Asesinato de Obregón-Año 1928 (Continuación)-Año 1929. 1. ed. Vol. 2. 4 vols. México: Editorial Jus, 1997.

Rius Facius, Antonio. Méjico Cristero: Historia de la ACJM 1925 a 1931. México, D.F.: Editorial Patria, 1960.

Visual / Audio recordings

Ramos, Manuel. México y su gente, 1926–1928. Filmed and edited 1926–1928. Restored version curated by Alfonso Morales Carrillo, music selection from traditional Mexican public domain music, Museo de la Ciudad de México, Oct. 2012–Nov. 2013. Dirección General de Rescate, Difusión y Producción del Acervo, Elia del Carmen Ramírez Bocardo. Research by Mari Carmen Tostado Gutiérrez, Carmen Nava Nava, María Isabel Fernández, and Luis Lupone. Silent film, 60 min, 9.5 mm.

=== Oral histories ===
- Jean Meyer Cristero Rebellion Oral History Collection is a significant archival resource housed at the University of Notre Dame's Hesburgh Libraries. This collection comprises a series of interviews conducted by Jean Meyer and others between 1960 and 2015, capturing firsthand accounts of individuals who experienced the Cristero War (1926–1929) in Mexico. Available at: https://archivesspace.library.nd.edu/repositories/3/resources/1549

== Secondary sources ==
- Bailey, David C. Viva Cristo Rey! The Cristero Rebellion and the Church-State Conflict in Mexico (1974); 376pp; a standard scholarly history
- Butler, Matthew. Popular Piety and political identity in Mexico's Cristero Rebellion: Michoacán, 1927–29. Oxford: Oxford University Press, 2004.
- Ellis, L. Ethan (1958). "Dwight Morrow and the Church-State Controversy in Mexico". The Hispanic American Historical Review. 38 (4): 482–505. doi:10.2307/2510111. JSTOR 2510111.
- Espinosa, David (2003). ""Restoring Christian Social Order": The Mexican Catholic Youth Association (1913-1932)". The Americas. 59 (4): 451–474. doi:10.1353/tam.2003.0037. JSTOR 1008566. S2CID 143528516.
- Horn, James J. (1973). "Did the United States Plan an Invasion of Mexico in 1927?". Journal of Interamerican Studies and World Affairs. 15 (4): 454–471. doi:10.2307/175010. JSTOR 175010.
- Jrade, Ramon (1985). "Inquiries into the Cristero Insurrection against the Mexican Revolution". Latin American Research Review. 20 (2): 53–69. doi:10.1017/S0023879100034488. JSTOR 2503520. S2CID 133451500.
- Lawrence, Mark. Insurgency, Counter-insurgency and Policing in Centre-West Mexico, 1926–1929 (Bloomsbury. 2020).
- Meade, Teresa A. History of Modern Latin America: 1800 to the Present (Wiley-Blackwell, 2016).
- Meyer, Jean. The Cristero Rebellion: The Mexican People between Church and State, 1926–1929. Cambridge, 1976.
- Miller, Sr. Barbara (1984). "The Role of Women in the Mexican Cristero Rebellion: Las Señoras y Las Religiosas". The Americas. 40 (3): 303–323. doi:10.2307/981116. JSTOR 981116. S2CID 147564218.
- Purnell, Jenny. Popular Movements and State Formation in Revolutionary Mexico: The Agraristas and Cristeros of Michoacán. Durham: Duke University Press, 1999.
- Quirk, Robert E. The Mexican Revolution and the Catholic Church, 1910–1929, Greenwood Press, 1986.
- Rice, M. Elizabeth Ann. The diplomatic relations between the United States and Mexico, as affected by the struggle for religious liberty in Mexico, 1925–1929 (1959) online
- Tuck, Jim. The Holy War in Los Altos: A Regional Analysis of Mexico's Cristero Rebellion. University of Arizona Press, 1982. ISBN 978-0-8165-0779-5
- Young, Julia. Mexican Exodus: Emigrants, Exiles, and Refugees of the Cristero War. New York: Oxford University Press, 2015.
- Kloppe-Santamaría, Gema. In the Vortex of Violence : Lynching, Extralegal Justice, and the State in Post-Revolutionary Mexico. University of California Press, 2020.
- Andes, Stephen J. C. The Mysterious Sofía: One Woman's Mission to Save Catholicism in Twentieth-Century Mexico. UNP - Nebraska, 2019.
- Andes, Stephen J. C. The Vatican and Catholic Activism in Mexico and Chile: The Politics of Transnational Catholicism, 1920–1940. First Edition., University Press, 2014.
- Cejudo Ramos, Elizabeth. El gobierno no puede más que Dios: Género, ciudadanía y conflicto Iglesia-Estado en el Sonora posrevolucionario. Universidad de Sonora, 2021.
- Chowning, Margaret. Catholic Women and Mexican Politics, 1750–1940. University Press, 2023.
- Demers, Maurice. Connected Struggles: Catholics, Nationalists, and Transnational Relations between Mexico and Quebec, 1917–1945. McGill-Queen's University Press, 2014.
