= Enrique Gorostieta =

Mexican general (1890–1929)

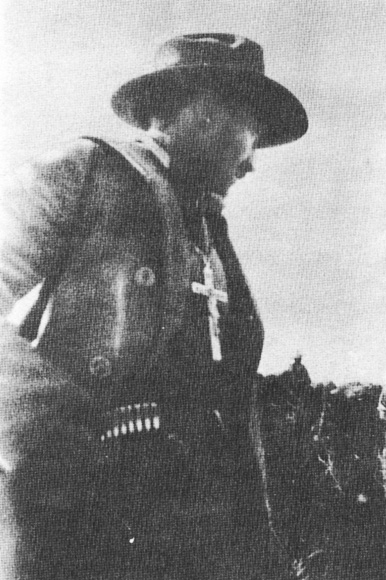
- Born: 1889; Monterrey, Nuevo León, Mexico
- Died: June 2, 1929 (aged 39–40); Atotonilco el Alto, Jalisco, Mexico
- Military career
- Allegiance: Mexico
- Rank: General
- Conflicts: Mexican Revolution; Cristero War
- Other work: Soap manufacturer

Enrique Gorostieta Velarde (Monterrey, 1889 – Atotonilco el Alto, June 2, 1929) was a Mexican soldier best known for his leadership as a general during the Cristero War.

== Life ==
Born in Monterrey into a prominent Mexican family of Basque descent, Enrique Gorostieta Velarde had a typically secular education. His early life is not well documented, but it is known that his father, an attorney and businessman, had personal ties with Victoriano Huerta, and that Enrique was encouraged by his mother to take up a military career, and he enrolled at the Heroic Military College of Chapultepec in 1906. Upon graduation in May 1911, the same month Porfirio Díaz stepped down from the Presidency, Gorostieta — as a protege of Victoriano Huerta — served on campaigns against Emiliano Zapata in September 1911 and against Pascual Orozco in April–May 1912. During Huerta's short dictatorship of 1913–14, Gorostieta's father was Secretary of the Treasury (Secretario de Hacienda).

During the Mexican Revolution he served in the Federal Army of counterrevolutionary dictator Victoriano Huerta, being Huerta's youngest general, and after Huerta's fall fought with Juan Andreu Almazán, but soon fled Mexico for exile in Cuba and later the United States. Upon his return to Mexico, he worked as a soap manufacturer, but found the work boring, and longed for a return to military activity.

In 1927 the National League for the Defense of Religious Liberty offered him command of the Cristeros, an army of Catholic rebels fighting against religious persecution by the government forces of President and Institutional Revolutionary Party (PRI) founder Plutarco Elías Calles.

Gorostieta has been called a Mason and lifelong anti-clerical, but recent letters of his have led historians to believe he was neither. Gorostieta's motivation for taking command of the rebels was not only the high salary he was offered (about 3000 pesos per month, or twice the salary of a regular Army General), or even his political ambition, but his passionate belief in defending religious freedom. Gorostieta's 1928 "Plan de Los Altos" called for changes to the 1917 Constitution's Article 27 (which the Cristeros saw as restricting the rights of Catholics) and — more important to Gorostieta — install a regime based upon Classical Liberalism in Mexico. Philosophically, he favored a return to the Juarez-inspired 1857 Constitution and its view of non-interference and toleration for religion, rather than the Calles' administration's reading of the 1917 Constitution as demanding the subordination of all religious organizations to the state. Although openly contemptuous of his subordinates' religious faith (several of his officers were priests), Gorostieta respected the military acumen of the Jalisco farmers under his command, and believed he could turn them into a professional fighting force equal to the regular army.

His importance as a Cristero leader was in bringing military discipline to an unorganized insurgency. He is credited with turning Cristero "armies" into a Cristero Army, which, for a time, was winning battles in the limited region where it operated: rural Jalisco, Michoacan, Colima and Zacatecas. However, without support from the Mexican church hierarchy or the Vatican and torn by internal dissension, the Cristeros were largely irrelevant as a political or military force as a negotiated settlement was worked out by Monsignor Edmund A. Walsh between the Vatican and the Mexican state over interpretations of the Church's rights under the Constitution.

== Death ==
Nineteen days before a cessation of hostilities, based on an agreement worked out by U.S. Ambassador Dwight Morrow between Pope Pius XI and Mexican bishop Pascual Díaz y Barreto, was to take effect, Gorostieta was killed in action following a Mexican government military intelligence operation (2 June 1929). With the movement rapidly collapsing, Gorostieta was attempting a retreat into Michoacán, where he hoped to recruit followers and continue the rebellion. A Federal officer, who had infiltrated the Cristero's as a mole inside Gorostieta's inner circle, tipped off the Mexican cavalry to the general's presence in Atotonilco, Jalisco, and killed him in a short firefight.

== In popular culture ==
Gorostieta was portrayed by Andy Garcia in the 2012 film Cristiada, aka "For Greater Glory", an epic historical drama also starring Eva Longoria, Eduardo Verástegui and Peter O'Toole.
