= National League for the Defense of Religious Liberty =

Mexican religious civil rights organization

- Liga Nacional Defensora de la Libertad Religiosa
- Flag of the LNDLR
- Abbreviation: LNDLR
- Nickname: Cristeros
- Formation: March 1925
- Dissolved: c. 1940
- Purpose: Opposition to anti-clericalism in Mexico
- Headquarters: Mexico
- Members: 36,000 (1925)

The National League for the Defense of Religious Liberty (Spanish: Liga Nacional Defensora de la Libertad Religiosa – LNDLR) was a Mexican Catholic religious civil rights organization formed in March 1925 that played a crucial role in the Cristero War of 1926 to 1929.

== History ==
The Mexico City-based organization was created by former members of the short-lived National Catholic Party (Partido Católico Nacional), the Union of Mexican Catholic Ladies (Unión de Damas Católicas Mexicanas); a student organization, the Jesuit-led Catholic Association of Mexican Youth (Asociación Católica de la Juventud Mexicana, ACJM); the Knights of Columbus; the National Parents' Association; and the National Catholic Labor Confederation. The League had by June of its founding year about 36,000 members and chapters in almost every state of the country. The organization arose after the anti-clerical provisions of the 1917 Mexican Constitution were enforced by the President Plutarco Calles and after he enacted further provisions in the Calles Law.

The LNDLR, along with the Catholic hierarchy, initially advocated peaceful resistance to the Calles Laws including a boycott of tax payment and nonessential goods and a petition drive to rescind the offending constitutional provisions. When the Church failed to obtain a compromise from Calles, the Mexican hierarchy ordered the priests to go on strike beginning July 31, 1926, the day the Calles Law was to go into effect.

Soon after the clerical strike began on July 31, 1926, sporadic popular uprisings began and beginning in September 1926 the LNDLR began to discuss revolt, but they maintained the policy of boycott. As the popular uprisings continued, especially in Jalisco and Colima, despite the lack of formal support from the bishops, the LNDLR advocated on January 1, 1927, open rebellion to overthrow the regime and institute a new constitution with guarantees of religious freedom.

While the LNDLR served the purpose of giving the rebelling peasants organizational structure and military guidance, the onset, development and character of the war were more rooted in grass roots circumstance and groups. At first the rebellion was only able to sustain suppression in a half dozen western states where there was intense popular support and the organizational aid of local groups, the Popular Union (UP), initially spearheaded by Anacleto González Flores and the covert U, with cells dispersed throughout Jalisco and Michoacán.

In 1927, the LNDLR reorganized the rebellion in the west and, in August 1928, gave the rebellion its first military leader: General Enrique Gorostieta – well-experienced soldier who had fought in the Federal Army under former President Victoriano Huerta. Gorostieta has been called a Mason and lifelong anti-clerical, but recent letters of his have led historians to believe he was neither. Gorostieta's motivation for taking command of the rebels was not only the high salary he was offered (about $3,000 pesos per month, or twice the salary of a regular Army General), or even his political ambition, but his passionate belief in defending religious freedom. He was further motivated by his political ambition (seeing his successful leadership of the war effort as a springboard to win the presidency) and a $20,000 life insurance policy that would support his wife in the event of his death in battle. The Cristeros began to engage in large scale military assaults.

The LNDLR were excluded from any participation in the peace negotiations between the Mexican State and the Church. They rejected the argument of the Archbishop of Mexico, Pascual Díaz, "that the Cristeros were doomed to failure because they lacked the two critical elements: adequate military resources and the diplomatic support of the United States government. Alberto María Carreño, who was close to the archbishop of Mexico, "questioned the morality of continuing a war that could not be won."

After intense and lengthy negotiations by the U.S. ambassador Dwight W. Morrow, an accord (Arreglos) acceptable to both Calles and the Catholic hierarchy was reached and the bishops ordered the LNDLR to cease military and political activities and the Cristeros to lay down their weapons. A number of Cristeros continued fighting, in what some have called "La Segunda", that is the second Cristiada, but they did so without the support of the Church. The LNDLR's criticisms of the episcopal hierarchy's signing on to the Arreglos were blunted given the Vatican's support of the diplomatic accord, but also because Catholic Action, a new lay group firmly under the hierarchy's control, was used to rein in radicalized Catholic organizations following the Arreglos.
