= Calles Law =

Anti-clerical rule in 1920s Mexico

Law for Reforming the Penal Code
- Long title: Ley reformando el Código Penal para el Distrito y Territorios Federales sobre delitos del fuero común y delitos contra la Federación en materia de culto religioso y disciplina externa
- Citation: DOF 2-7-1926
- Signed by: Plutarco Elías Calles
- Signed: 14 June 1926
- Effective: 31 July 1926
- Repealed: 26 December 1938; DOF 15-7-1992
- Status: Repealed

The Calles Law (Spanish: Ley Calles), or Law for Reforming the Penal Code (ley de tolerancia de cultos, "law of worship tolerance"), was a statute enacted in Mexico in 1926, under the presidency of Plutarco Elías Calles, to enforce restrictions against the Catholic Church in Article 130 of the Mexican Constitution of 1917. Article 130 declared that the church and state are to remain separate. To that end, it required all "churches and religious groupings" to register with the state and placed restrictions on priests and ministers of all religions. Priests and ministers were prohibited from holding public office, canvassing on behalf of political parties or candidates, or inheriting property from persons other than close blood relatives. President Calles applied existing laws regarding the separation of church and state throughout Mexico and added his own legislation.

In June 1926, he signed the "Law for Reforming the Penal Code", which became known unofficially as the "Calles Law." This law provided specific penalties for priests and individuals who violated Article 130 of the 1917 Constitution. For example, wearing clerical garb in public was punishable by a fine of 500 pesos (approximately 250 U.S. dollars at the time, or worth $4,250 in 2010). A priest who criticized the government could be imprisoned up to five years. Some states enacted further measures in the name of church and state separation. Chihuahua, for example, enacted a law permitting only a single priest to serve the entire Catholic congregation of the state. Tabasco, on the other hand, introduced a law whereby all priests were required to be married to exercise their office (de facto banning the Catholic priesthood). To help enforce the law, Calles seized Church properties, expelled foreign priests, and closed monasteries, convents, and religious schools.

The Church saw the law as a trap to conform the Church to a tyrannical state. One result of the Calles Law was the Cristero War, a popular uprising of Catholic peasants in regions of central Mexico against the federal Mexican government. Between 1926 and 1934, at least 40 priests were killed during the war. Whereas Mexico had some 4,500 Catholic priests prior to the Cristero War, by 1934 only 334 Catholic priests were licensed by the government to serve Mexico's 15 million people. By 1935, 17 states were left with no priest at all. Under President Lázaro Cárdenas, the Calles Law was repealed in 1938.

== See also ==
- Red Shirts (Mexico)
- Tomás Garrido Canabal
- Adalberto Tejeda Olivares
