= Schlumberger brothers =

Founders of well logging company

Conrad Schlumberger
- Born: 2 October 1878; Gebweiler, Alsace-Lorraine, German Empire
- Died: 9 May 1936 (aged 57); Stockholm, Sweden
- Education: École Polytechnique
- Known for: Creation of the Société de Prospection Electrique
- Mother: Marguerite De Witt
- Relatives: Marcel Schlumberger, brother
- Scientific career
- Fields: Geophysics
- Workplaces: École des Mines de Paris

Emile Henry Marcel Schlumberger
- Born: 21 June 1884; Gebweiler, Alsace-Lorraine, German Empire
- Died: 9 May 1953 (aged 68); Val-Richer, Saint-Ouen-le-Pin, Calvados, France
- Education: École Centrale Paris
- Known for: Creation of the Société de Prospection Electrique
- Mother: Marguerite De Witt
- Relatives: Pierre Schlumberger, son; Conrad Schlumberger, brother; Léa Seydoux, actress, great-great-granddaughter
- Scientific career
- Fields: Geophysics
- Workplaces: École des Mines de Paris

Conrad Schlumberger (2 October 1878 – 9 May 1936) and Emile Henry Marcel Schlumberger (21 June 1884 – 9 May 1953) were two French brothers from the region of Alsace-Lorraine, France, then a part of the German Empire. Their inventions in the area of geophysics and well logging were the beginnings of Schlumberger Well Services and the entire well logging industry. They held both French and German citizenships.

== Life and work ==
Conrad and Marcel were two of six children of an affluent Alsatian Protestant family. Their father, Paul, was descended from a wealthy cotton weaving family. Their mother, Marguerite De Witt, was a political activist. When the brothers were born, their native province Alsace was part of Germany. Their parents decided to send the brothers to Paris to be educated. Both Conrad and Marcel were educated at the top engineering schools in France; Conrad graduated from École Polytechnique in 1900, whereas Marcel graduated from École Centrale Paris in 1907.

Conrad initially worked as a mining engineer at Rodez and Toulouse, and Marcel pursued a career as a railway engineer before participating in the construction of the first French tanks during the first World War. In 1912, Conrad, then a professor at the École des Mines de Paris conceived the idea of prospecting for metal ore deposits by using the electrical conductivity of ore rocks to distinguish them from the less conductive surrounding country rocks. One of the first tests was performed in a bathtub which was filled with various rocks for the experiments. In 1919, the brothers signed an agreement with their father in which their father would support their scientific research. These experiments led to an electrical surface-measuring system for mineral exploration known as a "Schlumberger array."

In 1923, the brothers began conducting geophysical surveys in various countries including Romania, Serbia, Canada, Union of South Africa, Belgian Congo, and the United States. In 1926, Henri George Doll (Conrad's son-in-law) joined the group. In 1926, the brothers formed Société de Prospection Electrique to develop the theory that adding resistivity information from deeper formations would increase the effectiveness of the surface prospecting technique.The first office was in Paris on the rue Fabert.

On 5 September 1927, Henri George Doll and several field engineers ran the first wireline electric log. This log was of the Diefenbach #2905 well, Rig 7 of the Pechelbronn Oil Company at Merkwiller-Pechelbronn in the Bas-Rhin. The well was about 500 meters deep but only the interval from 130m to 270m was logged. A measurement was made every meter. The equipment was stopped, and the logging cable was connected to the surface potentiometer and to a battery power supply to make a measurement. The logging rate was about 50 meters per hour. The Schlumberger brothers called this technique an "Electrical Survey", but the more common name "well log" was coined a few years later in the United States.

At that time, Pechelbronn was the only oil field known in France. On 28 July 1928, the owners of the oil field signed a contract with the Schlumberger company to do oil well logging. The first contract was for 12,000 Francs (about $2600 US dollars) per month. This was the first well logging program.

The Schlumberger company then tried to expand their activities to many other countries, but the attempts were hindered by the worldwide depression. On 15 September 1934, Schlumberger's subsidiary in the United States became Schlumberger Well Surveying Corporation (SWSC) with offices in Houston, Texas. Conrad was the chairman, and Marcel was the president. In 1936, Conrad died of a heart attack while returning from a business trip to the Soviet Union. During the German occupation of France, the company headquarters was moved from Paris to Houston. Marcel died in 1953. After World War II, Marcel's son Pierre Schlumberger took over the American company. Pierre Schlumberger's second wife was the eccentric São Schlumberger, who was for some years the biggest individual customer of haute couture clothing.

In 1955, in recognition of Conrad Schlumberger's outstanding contribution to exploration geophysics, The European Association of Exploration Geophysicists (now European Association of Geoscientists and Engineers) established a Conrad Schlumberger Award. Each year the Award is presented to a member of the Association who has made an outstanding contribution over a period of time to the scientific and technical advancement of the geosciences, particularly geophysics. Notable recipients of the award include Nigel Anstey, Les Hatton and Michael Schoenberg, among others.

Marcel Schlumberger's great-great-granddaughter is actress Léa Seydoux on her father's side, and she is a great-granddaughter of Marcel's brother Maurice on her mother's side.
