= Anne Gruner Schlumberger =

French heiress and philanthropist (1905-1993)

Anne Gruner Schlumberger (1905–1993) was a French heiress, philanthropist and patron of arts and science. Her father was Conrad Schlumberger, one of the founders of the oil exploration company Schlumberger and her mother was Louise Schlumberger (née Delpech). She was married to Henri George Doll, whom she accompanied to oil sites in Mexico and Russia, and in New York, between 1941 and 1955. After her divorce, she returned to France, subsequently dividing her time between Paris and Greece. Her sister was Dominique de Menil.

Schlumberger expressed support to art, literature and science through many sponsorship activities encouraging creativity in all its forms. Among others, she was known for establishing the Fondation des Treilles and setting up more than twenty children's libraries in rural areas of Greece.
