= Öz Yılmaz =

Turkish geophysicist

Öz Yılmaz is the chief technology officer of GeoTomo LLC and the founder of Anatolian Geophysical. He is the author of Seismic Data Processing and Seismic Data Analysis, the principal reference volumes for the seismic processing industry.

== Education ==
Born in Ardahan, Turkey, Yılmaz graduated from Haydarpasha Lyceum in Istanbul and went on to earn a BS in geology with geophysics option from the University of Missouri-Rolla. He earned an MS in 1972 from Stanford University working on rock physics. After five years in the oil and gas industry, he earned his PhD from Stanford in 1979. His dissertation on prestack partial migration was a major contribution to seismic processing.

== Career ==
Yılmaz started his career at the Turkish Petroleum Company between earning his MS and PhD. After earning his PhD in 1979 he worked for Western Geophysical and Paradigm. In 1987 he published Seismic Data Processing, a SEG best-seller. In 1991 he was awarded the Conrad Schlumberger Award by the European Association of Geoscientists and Engineers for "his sustained contributions to the theory and practice of seismic data processing".

== Seismic Data Processing and Seismic Data Analysis ==
In 1987 Yılmaz published Seismic Data Processing through the Society of Exploration Geophysicists. In the preface he points out the three main steps in exploring for oil and gas using reflection seismology: data acquisition, data processing, and interpretation. The intended purpose of the book was to help seismic processors understand the fundamentals of processing seismic data. He pointed out the main challenges in seismic processing:

1. Selecting the proper sequence of processing steps appropriate for the field data under consideration.
2. Selecting an appropriate set of parameters for each processing step.
3. Evaluating the resulting output from each processing step, then diagnosing any problem caused by improper parameter selection.

In 2001 Yılmaz published the follow-up two volume Seismic Data Analysis which incorporated emerging technologies in seismic exploration such as 3D seismic, time-lapse seismic, and 4-component seismic.
