= Michel Campillo =

French geophysicist

Michel Campillo is a French seismologist and geophysicist who is currently a professor at Grenoble Alpes University.

== Early life and education ==
Michel Campillo was born in 1957 in Chambon sur Lignon. He studied physics at university, receiving a Master's degree in 1979.

- Postgraduate thesis: Calculation of near-field radiation from a dynamic seismic source.
- Thèse d'État: Synthetic seismograms in heterogeneous elastic media: methodological development and applications.

Specialising in geophysics, Campillo subsequently obtained his PhD in 1982 and his Doctorat d'État in 1986 at Joseph Fourier University under the direction of Michel Bouchon.

== Career ==
Campillo started his career as a research associate at the CNRS in 1983. In 1989, he became a professor at Joseph Fourier University (today part of Grenoble Alpes University) at the Laboratory of Internal Geophysics and Tectonophysics (now the Institute of Earth Sciences). From 1997 to 2002, he directed the laboratory and from 2004 to 2012, he was the head of its "Ondes et Structures" research group.

He currently holds the chair "Artificial intelligence for natural hazard and geo-resources" together with Olivier Michel (a professor at Grenoble INP) at the Interdisciplinary Institute of Artificial Intelligence in Grenoble.

He spent several periods at the University of Southern California, the University of California Santa Barbara, the Massachusetts Institute of Technology and the GeoForschungsZentrum-Potsdam.

He is a member of the French Academy of Sciences and of the Institut Universitaire de France.

== Scientific work ==
=== Scientific activities ===
Michel Campillo is a seismologist. He is therefore interested in both the processes responsible for earthquakes and the seismic waves that reveal the structure of the Earth. He has studied major earthquakes but also the phenomena of transient deformation that have been highlighted in recent years. He has proposed innovative methods for imaging the Earth from ambient seismic noise and multiply scattered waves. His current work focuses on the temporal monitoring of the mechanical properties of rocks associated with tectonic deformation.

He has worked in interdisciplinary and international collaborations and very closely with students and post-docs with whom he has published more than 200 papers. His initial work concerned the modelling of seismic radiation from dynamic cracks and then the imaging of the fracture process of large earthquakes through the inversion in the spectral domain of local seismic and geodetic data. He then analysed the slip initiation phase, characterised the stable/unstable transition in complex geometries and introduced the concept of effective friction of a heterogeneous fault. More recently he has been interested in slow earthquakes and in particular in their intermittent nature.

Michel Campillo has studied wave propagation through data analysis and numerical simulation, in particular with integral equation methods and applications to seismic risk. This work has shown the importance of the multiple scattering regime of seismic waves, which has led to considering these waves from the perspective of mesoscopic physics. This led to the reconstruction of the Earth's response between two distant points using continuous recordings of ambient noise. This passive approach produced 3D tomographic images of unprecedented resolution and opened the way to the temporal monitoring of long-term mechanical properties. He is now studying the small changes associated with tectonic deformations in fault zones and the accompanying microseismicity.

=== Main publications ===
Michel Campillo pointed out the conjunction of effects linked to seismic rupture, wave propagation and local conditions to explain the heavy damage produced in Mexico City by the Michoacan earthquake. The terminology 'source, path and site effects' is widely used. It introduced the joint use of seismic data and radar interferometry in a non-linear inversion of the slip evolution during a large earthquake and showed the existence of long-range correlations in multiply diffracted seismic wave fields and paved the way for the use of ambient noise for seismic imaging.

Michel Campillo and Anne Paul have shown the existence of long-range correlations in multiply diffracted seismic wave fields and this has paved the way for the use of ambient noise for seismic imaging. The first use of seismic noise for regional-scale seismic tomography was conducted over California. Hundreds of nearly identical applications have since been carried out in different parts of the world. It was in a methodological paper that he showed the extent of the possibilities of using noise correlations as virtual seismograms containing direct waves, surface waves and diffracted wave coda. The use of higher order correlations is now booming.

It has been demonstrated that a moderate earthquake produces changes in elastic parameters in the crust and that the associated changes in seismic velocity can be measured continuously from ambient noise. The properties of diffuse seismic wave fields (energy partitioning between modes) were measured and modelled to demonstrate how these observables carry information about the structure beneath the stations. This is a growing field in engineering seismology.

Michel Campillo discussed the relative shares for seismic rupture of local friction properties and their spatial heterogeneity. He shows in 3D elasticity the relevance of the concept of effective friction introduced in Campillo et al. (2001) to describe the large-scale behaviour of the rupture (initiation duration, slip distribution, rupture velocity. . .). He also published the first application of ambient noise analysis to deep structures. These results have been extended to the core and the field is expanding.

For the first time a continuous analysis of temporal changes in seismic velocities on a regional scale has been carried out using data from the Japanese network which prefigures the networks of the future. Seismic susceptibility" measures the sensitivity of rocks to non-linear effects, a susceptibility that is highest in the edifices and volcanoes of Honshu.

Recent work is a (temporary) conclusion of the work on the phenomena of slow landslides and tremors, new classes of seismic observations discovered in the 21st century. It shows that, contrary to the prevailing intuitive idea, large transient landslides with magnitudes greater than 7 and durations of several months are not smooth and continuous phenomena but intermittent landslide processes on short time scales. These observations call into question the friction models proposed for these events and open up a new field of investigation.

== Functions and awards ==
=== Functions ===
- Director, Doctoral Training 'Mechanics of Geophysical Environments and Environment' (1995-1997)
- Director, Laboratory of Internal Geophysics and Tectonophysics of Joseph Fourier University, CNRS UMR 5559 (1997-2002)
- Director of the National IFA 'Land Risks' Programme of the Ministry of Research and Technology (1999-2002)
- Member of the CNRS Ethics Committee (2007-2017)
- Member of the Board of Directors of Joseph Fourier University (2008-2012)
- Board of Directors of the Seismological Society of America (2011-2014)

=== Awards ===
- Gabriel Sand Prize of the French Academy of sciences, 1991
- Institut Universitaire de France, junior member, 1994
- CNRS Silver Medal, 2003
- Jaffé Prize of the French Academy of sciences, 2005
- Institut Universitaire de France, Senior Member, 2006
- Fellow of the American Geophysical Union (AGU)
- Gutenberg Lecturer, Seismology section of AGU, 2008
- European Research Council Advanced Grant, 2009
- Lorànd Eötvös Award (best paper award with P. Gouedard et al.) European Association of Geoscientists and Engineers, 2009
- Beno Gutenberg Medal, European Geosciences Union, 2012
- Scientific Grand Prize of the Del Duca Foundation/Institut de France, 2013
- Selection of Shapiro and Campillo (2004) by GRL for the 40th Anniversary Collection of the 40 most influential papers, 2014.
- Chevalier of the Légion d'Honneur, 2015
- European Research Council Advanced Grant, 2017
- Humbold Research Prize. The Alexander von Humboldt Foundation, Germany, 2017.
