= Conrad Schlumberger Award =

European award

The Conrad Schlumberger Award is an award given to one of the members of European Association of Geoscientists and Engineers. The award is given each year to one that has made an outstanding contribution over a period of time to the scientific and technical advancement of the geosciences, particularly geophysics. The award is made annually by the EAGE Board.

== History ==
The Conrad Schlumberger Award was created in 1955, as a recognition of Conrad Schlumberger's outstanding contribution to exploration geophysics, by the European Association of Geoscientists and Engineers (then named The European Association of Exploration Geophysicists.)

== List of recipients ==
- 2020 André Revil
- 2019 Andrey Bakulin
- 2018 Johan Robertsson and Phil Christie
- 2017 José M. Carcione
- 2016 Stewart Greenhalgh
- 2015 Alain Tabbagh
- 2014 Valentina Socco
- 2013 Kees Wapenaar
- 2012 Martin Landrø
- 2011 Sergey Fomel
- 2010 Lasse Amundsen
- 2009 Gerhard Pratt
- 2008 Clive McCann
- 2007 Colin Macbeth
- 2006 Petar Stavrev
- 2005 Horst Rüter
- 2004 Eric de Bazelaire
- 2003 Tariq Alkhalifah
- 2002 M. Tygel
- 2001 R. Marschall
- From June 2001, award dates refer to the year in which the award was presented and not to the year in which the winning poster/paper was presented.
- 1999 Peter Weidelt
- 1998 Vlastislav Cerveny
- 1997 Jacob T. Fokkema
- 1996 Michael Schoenberg
- 1995 Patrick Lailly
- 1994 P. Newman
- 1993 Bjørn Ursin
- 1992 L. Dresen
- 1991 Oz Yilmaz
- 1990 Fabio Rocca
- 1989 Albert Tarantola
- 1988 Ken Larner
- 1987 Les Hatton
- 1986 S. Crampin
- 1985 S.M. Deregowski
- 1984 K. Helbig
- 1983 Johann Sattlegger
- 1982 Anton Ziolkowski
- 1981 W.E. Lerwill
- 1980 A.J. "Guus" Berkhout
- 1979 Theodore Krey
- 1978 No award
- 1977 Peter Hubral
- 1976 J.G. (Mendel) Hagedoorn
- 1975 Milo M. Backus and R.L. Chen
- 1974 N. de Voogd
- 1973 Roy E. White
- 1972 P. Bois
- 1971 P.N.S. O'Brien
- 1970 H. Naudy
- 1969 Sven Treitel and Enders A. Robinson
- 1968 Helmut Linsser
- 1967 Robert Garotta and Dominique Michon
- 1966 Jacques D'Hoeraene
- 1965 O. Koefoed
- 1964 Nigel Anstey
- 1963 G. Grau
- 1962 No award
- 1961 G. Kunetz
- 1960 Reinhard Bortfeld
- 1959 L. Alfano
- 1958 Umberto Colombo
- 1957 O. Kappelmeyer
- 1956 No award
- 1955 H. Flathe

== See also ==
- List of geophysicists
- List of geophysics awards
- Prizes named after people
