= Émile Baas =

French essayist (1906–1984)

- Born: 3 March 1906; Guebwiller
- Died: 4 June 1984 (aged 78); Strasbourg
- Occupations: Essayist; Professor of philosophy

Émile Baas (3 March 1906 – 4 June 1984) was a 20th-century French essayist.

== Works (selection) ==
- 1945: Réflexions sur le régionalisme, les Éditions Scouts de France, La Hutte, Lyon
- 1953: Introduction critique au marxisme : perspectives marxistes, perspectives chrétiennes, Alsatia, Colmar, (new edition, fully revised, of the booklet: L'Humanisme marxiste, by the same author, 1947)
- 1973: Situation de l'Alsace, Alsatia, Colmar (1945 text with an afterword by the author)

== See also ==
- Catholic Office of Information and Initiative for Europe
