= Les Hatton =

British mathematician and computer scientist

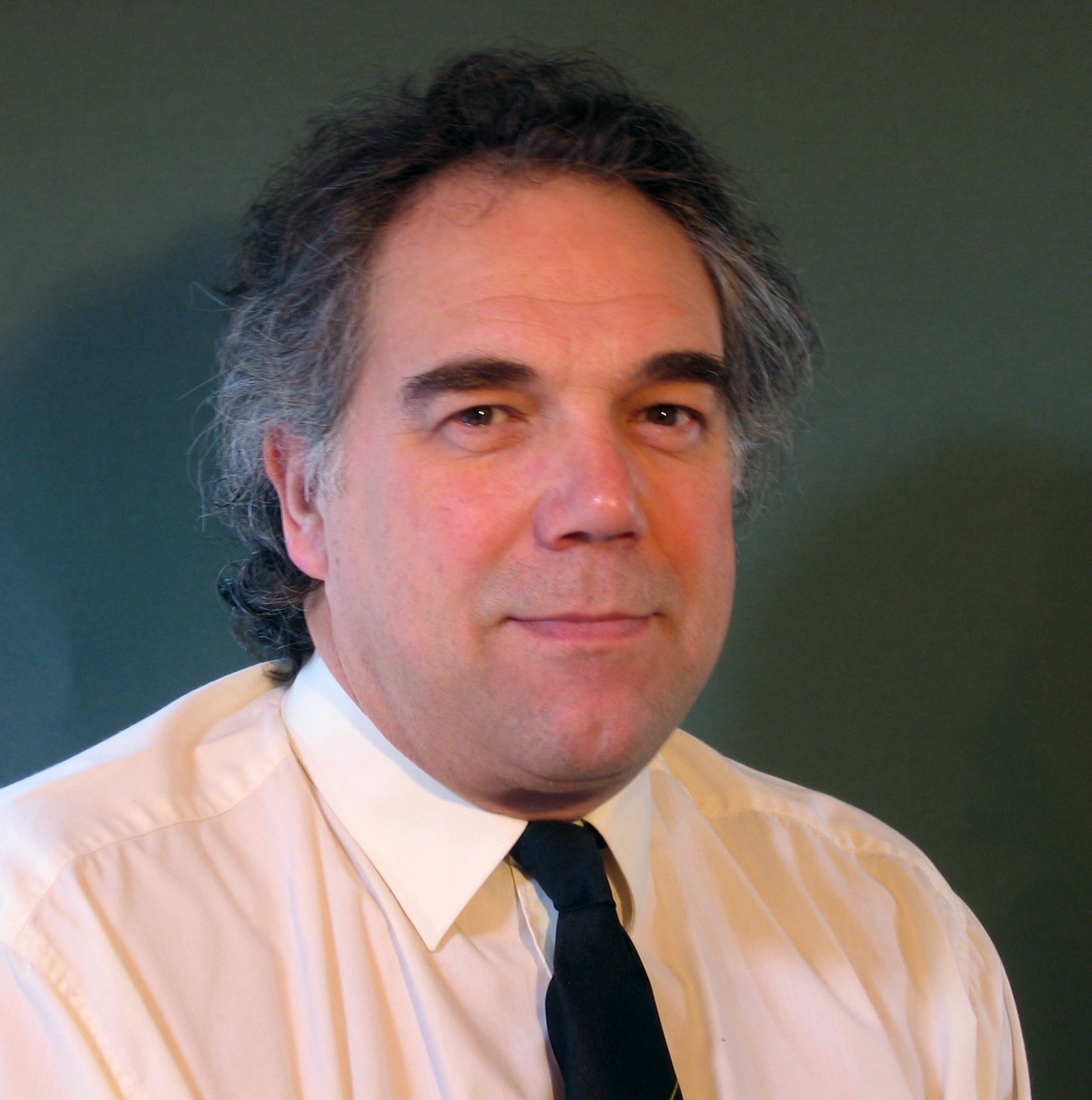
- Born: 5 February 1948 (age 78)
- Education: King's College, Cambridge
- Known for: Safer C book
- Awards: Conrad Schlumberger Award (1987)
- Scientific career
- Fields: Software engineering
- Workplaces: Kingston University, University of Manchester, University of Cambridge
- Thesis: On the dynamics of concentrated atmospheric vortices (1973)
- Website: www.leshatton.org

Les Hatton (born 5 February 1948) is a British mathematician and computer scientist known for his work on failures and vulnerabilities in software-controlled systems, and for later work applying information theory to genetics and other discrete systems with collaborator Gregory Warr.

== Early life and education ==
Hatton was born in Denton, near Manchester, the son of Leslie Hatton, a carpenter, and Mary Hatton. He attended Audenshaw Grammar School (now Audenshaw School) from 1959 to 1966, before winning a place at King's College, Cambridge, where he initially read physics before switching to mathematics. He was awarded a full Blue in athletics as a javelin thrower in 1969 and 1970.

He then moved to the University of Manchester, completing a Master of Science degree on electrostatic oscillations in a relativistic plasma and a PhD, submitted in 1973, on the dynamics of convective atmospheric vortices.

He later added a Performer's Diploma in classical guitar from the London College of Music (1980), an LLM in IT law from the University of Strathclyde (1999), and, in 2018, a BSc in mathematics and physics from the Open University.

== Career ==
=== Atmospheric physics ===
Hatton's doctoral research produced two papers on atmospheric vortex flows. The first used similarity methods to find one of a small number of known separable solutions of the complete incompressible Navier–Stokes equations, describing a vortex in contact with a solid surface, which he used to model the lower core of a tornado. The second showed that vortices in contact with a water surface, such as waterspouts, develop a two-cell structure with axial downflow and radial inflow.

Hatton joined the United Kingdom Meteorological Office in 1973 as part of its numerical forecasting team, publishing on tracing trajectories through a numerical weather model with R. I. Sykes. He left in 1974 to become a geophysicist with Western Geophysical Company in Houston, Texas.

=== Geophysics ===
As a geophysicist, Hatton worked in computational seismology, co-authoring award-winning papers with Ken Larner, Bruce Gibson and others. In 1979 he co-founded a geophysical company in Surrey, for which he led development of SKS, a portable Fortran 77 seismic data processing package. He was awarded the 1987 Conrad Schlumberger Award by the European Association of Geoscientists and Engineers for his work on seismic wave propagation and its computational application.

With M. H. Worthington and J. Makin, Hatton co-wrote the textbook Seismic Data Processing: Theory and Practice (1986); with G. E. Parkes he co-wrote The Marine Seismic Source (1986). With A. M. Ziolkowski and others, he developed a theory and practical implementation of "notional" sources, allowing the acoustic far-field of interacting marine airgun arrays to be modelled from near-field measurements; this and later refinements are widely used in the seismic industry. From 2002 he returned part-time to geophysics to commercialise this work as "Gundalf", a marine seismic source acquisition package.

=== Software engineering and software failure ===
After encountering significant undiscovered software failures earlier in his career, Hatton moved into software engineering research around 1990. In 1994, with Andy Roberts, he published a widely cited comparison of eight mature Fortran 77 seismic processing packages with identical specified functionality, finding substantial, non-random disagreement between their outputs that grew with code size. The study has been cited in later work on the reliability of scientific code and on computational reproducibility.

His book Safer C measured how often statically detectable defects occur in C code, and was reviewed in Software Testing, Verification and Reliability. In a 2004 paper he examined the rationale and empirical basis of safer language subsets such as MISRA C, proposing a taxonomy of subset rules and arguing such standards should be grounded in measured fault data.

Hatton has described an approach he terms "forensic software engineering", which collects defect data from deployed systems, independent of development methodology or tools, to identify recurring failure patterns. With Darrel Ince and John Graham-Cumming, he co-authored a 2012 Nature perspective, "The case for open computer programs", on the reliance of published research on unscrutinised source code. He wrote an invited 2023 review of dependable computing for Computer, and, with Michiel van Genuchten, a 2024 IEEE Software column on trust in software systems written in the wake of the British Post Office scandal.

His book E-mail Forensics: Eliminating Spam, Scams and Phishing (2011) applies forensic-analysis techniques to email security.

He has published four books and over 100 refereed journal papers, including in IEEE Software and IEEE Computational Science and Engineering. He was cited among the leading scholars of systems and software engineering by the Journal of Systems and Software for the period 1997–2001.

Hatton has also published on artificial complexity in mobile phone charging, the aerodynamics of javelins, and bibliographic search methods for defect databases.

After spending most of his career in industry, including as managing director of Oakwood Computing Associates, he became a professor of forensic software engineering at Kingston University, London, from which he retired as emeritus professor in 2012.

== Information theory and discrete systems ==
From 2009, Hatton published a series of papers on power-law behaviour in software, initially alone and later with Gregory Warr of the Medical University of South Carolina. They proposed a principle they call the conservation of Hartley–Shannon information (CoHSI), modelling a discrete system as an ensemble of components built from tokens and applying statistical mechanics under constraints on the total number of tokens and the total information; they argued that the most likely equilibrium distribution for such systems is dominated by power-law behaviour.

Using this framework, Hatton and Warr have published on the length distribution of proteins and of computer-program functions, on the conservation of average protein length, and on a general derivation of Zipf's law for discrete systems. They presented the work for a general readership in Exposing Nature's Bias: The Hidden Clockwork behind Society, Life and the Universe (2022).

== Academic positions ==
Hatton has held several part-time academic posts: Industrial Fellow in Geology at Wolfson College, Oxford (1982–1984); visiting professor of geophysics at Delft University of Technology (1987–1990); professor of software reliability at the University of Kent Computing Laboratory (1997–2002); and professor of forensic software engineering at Kingston University (2004–2012), from which he retired as emeritus professor.

== Personal life ==
Hatton married Gillian Libretto in 1979; they have three adult children. A classically trained guitarist, he has played guitar and harmonica in jazz, blues and soul bands, and was an examiner for the London Registry of Guitar Tutors in the 1990s. He was British Masters M50 and M55 javelin champion, later switching to competitive shooting with an English longbow after injury.

== Selected publications ==
=== Books ===
- Hatton, L.; Worthington, M. H.; Makin, J. (1986). Seismic Data Processing: Theory and Practice. Oxford: Blackwell Scientific. ISBN 978-0-632-01374-6.
- Hatton, Les (1995). Safer C: Developing Software for High-integrity and Safety-critical Systems. London: McGraw-Hill. ISBN 978-0-07-707640-5.
- Hatton, Les (2011). E-mail Forensics: Eliminating Spam, Scams and Phishing. Bluespear Publishing. ISBN 978-1-908422-00-2.
- Hatton, Les; Warr, Greg (2022). Exposing Nature's Bias: The Hidden Clockwork behind Society, Life and the Universe. London: Bluespear Publishing. ISBN 978-1-908422-04-0.

=== Selected articles ===
- Hatton, Les; Roberts, Andy (1994). "How accurate is scientific software?". IEEE Transactions on Software Engineering. 20 (10): 785–797. Bibcode:1994ITSEn..20..785H. doi:10.1109/32.328993.
- Hatton, Les (2004). "Safer language subsets: an overview and a case history, MISRA C". Information and Software Technology. 46 (7): 465–472. doi:10.1016/j.infsof.2003.09.016.
- Ince, D. C.; Hatton, L.; Graham-Cumming, J. (2012). "The case for open computer programs". Nature. 482 (7386): 485–488. Bibcode:2012Natur.482..485I. doi:10.1038/nature10836. PMID 22358837.
- Hatton, Les; Warr, Gregory (2019). "Strong evidence of an information-theoretical conservation principle linking all discrete systems". Royal Society Open Science. 6 (10) 191101. Bibcode:2019RSOS....691101H. doi:10.1098/rsos.191101. PMC 6837184. PMID 31824716.

== See also ==
- Power law
- Software bug
