= Guebwiller =

Subprefecture and commune in Grand Est, France

- Commune
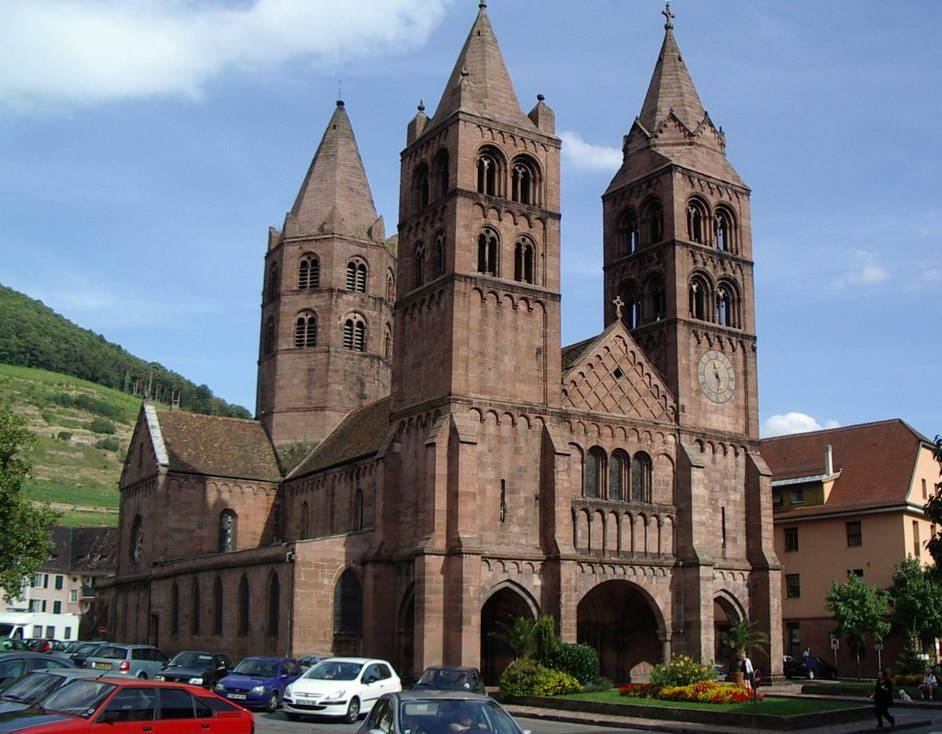
- St. Léger Church

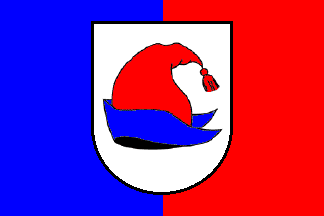
- Flag Coat of arms
- Location of Guebwiller
- Location within France Location within Grand Est
- Coordinates: 47°54′30″N 7°12′39″E
- Country: France
- Region: Grand Est
- Department: Haut-Rhin
- Arrondissement: Thann-Guebwiller
- Canton: Guebwiller
- Intercommunality: CC de la région de Guebwiller

Government
  - Mayor (2020–2026): Francis Kleitz (UDI)
- Area^{1}: 9.68 km^{2} (3.74 sq mi)
- Elevation: 300 m (980 ft)
- Highest elevation: 620 m (2,030 ft)
- Lowest elevation: 254 m (833 ft)
- Population (2023): 11,243
  - Density: 1,160/km^{2} (3,010/sq mi)
- Time zone: UTC+01:00 (CET)
  - Summer (DST): UTC+02:00 (CEST)
- INSEE/Postal code: 68112 /68500
- ^{1} French Land Register data, which excludes lakes, ponds, glaciers > 1 km^{2} (0.386 sq mi or 247 acres) and river estuaries.

Guebwiller (French pronunciation: [ɡebvilɛʁ]; Alsatian: Gàwiller [ˈkaːviləʁ]; German: Gebweiler) is a commune in the Haut-Rhin département in Grand Est in north-eastern France. It was a sub-prefecture of the department until 2015.

It is situated 20 km (12 mi) northwest of Mulhouse at the foot of the Vosges mountains. The Ballon de Guebwiller, the highest point in the Vosges, lies 8 km (5.0 mi) to the west of the town.

As of 2023, the population of the commune was 11,243. It is the centre of an urban area with about 29,000 inhabitants.

== History ==
Guebweiler, as Gebweiler, is mentioned as early as 774. It belonged to the religious foundation of Murbach, and in 1759 the abbots chose it for their residence. In 1789, at the outbreak of the French Revolution, the monastic buildings were laid in ruins, and, though the archives were rescued and removed to Colmar, the library perished.

== Geography ==
=== Climate ===
Guebwiller has an oceanic climate (Köppen climate classification Cfb). The average annual temperature in Guebwiller is 11.2 °C (52.2 °F). The average annual rainfall is 941.7 mm (37.07 in) with December as the wettest month. The temperatures are highest on average in July, at around 20.2 °C (68.4 °F), and lowest in January, at around 2.1 °C (35.8 °F). The highest temperature ever recorded in Guebwiller was 41.1 °C (106.0 °F) on 27 June 2026; the lowest temperature ever recorded was −16.3 °C (2.7 °F) on 20 December 2009.

Climate data for Guebwiller (1991–2020 normals, extremes 1991−present)
Month	Jan	Feb	Mar	Apr	May	Jun	Jul	Aug	Sep	Oct	Nov	Dec	Year
Record high °C (°F)	20.2 (68.4)	22.5 (72.5)	26.9 (80.4)	29.2 (84.6)	34.4 (93.9)	41.1 (106.0)	39.5 (103.1)	39.9 (103.8)	34.5 (94.1)	31.4 (88.5)	23.7 (74.7)	20.1 (68.2)	39.9 (103.8)
Mean daily maximum °C (°F)	5.5 (41.9)	7.4 (45.3)	11.9 (53.4)	16.6 (61.9)	20.6 (69.1)	24.2 (75.6)	26.0 (78.8)	25.9 (78.6)	21.2 (70.2)	15.7 (60.3)	9.2 (48.6)	6.1 (43.0)	15.9 (60.6)
Daily mean °C (°F)	2.4 (36.3)	3.7 (38.7)	7.2 (45.0)	11.2 (52.2)	15.3 (59.5)	18.7 (65.7)	20.5 (68.9)	20.3 (68.5)	16.1 (61.0)	11.5 (52.7)	6.3 (43.3)	3.2 (37.8)	11.4 (52.5)
Mean daily minimum °C (°F)	−0.6 (30.9)	0.0 (32.0)	2.6 (36.7)	5.9 (42.6)	9.9 (49.8)	13.3 (55.9)	14.9 (58.8)	14.6 (58.3)	10.9 (51.6)	7.3 (45.1)	3.0 (37.4)	0.3 (32.5)	6.8 (44.3)
Record low °C (°F)	−13.5 (7.7)	−14.6 (5.7)	−12.3 (9.9)	−3.3 (26.1)	0.6 (33.1)	4.1 (39.4)	7.0 (44.6)	5.3 (41.5)	2.0 (35.6)	−4.2 (24.4)	−9.9 (14.2)	−16.3 (2.7)	−16.3 (2.7)
Average precipitation mm (inches)	92.9 (3.66)	76.5 (3.01)	71.8 (2.83)	59.7 (2.35)	80.7 (3.18)	73.7 (2.90)	66.0 (2.60)	70.9 (2.79)	59.9 (2.36)	80.6 (3.17)	76.3 (3.00)	110.6 (4.35)	919.6 (36.2)
Average precipitation days (≥ 1.0 mm)	10.7	9.6	9.9	9.4	11.8	10.0	9.3	9.8	8.1	10.4	10.6	11.4	121.0
Source: Meteociel

== Population ==
Historical population
Year	Pop.	±% p.a.
1968	10,842	—
1975	11,076	+0.31%
1982	10,693	−0.50%
1990	10,944	+0.29%
1999	11,525	+0.58%
2007	11,658	+0.14%
2012	11,440	−0.38%
2017	11,094	−0.61%
2023	11,243	+0.22%
Source: INSEE

== People ==
Guebwiller was the birthplace of

- Émile Keller (1820-1909)
- Niklaus Riggenbach (1817-1899), engineer
- Théodore Deck (1823-1891), ceramist
- Gustave Schlumberger (1844-1929), historian, Byzantinist, numismatist
- Jean Schlumberger (1877-1968), publisher and writer
- Conrad Schlumberger (1878-1936), co-founder of Schlumberger
- Charles Hueber (1883-1943), politician
- Marcel Schlumberger (1884-1953), co-founder of Schlumberger
- Al Weill (1893-1969), boxing manager
- Alfred Kastler (1902-1984), physicist
- Émile Baas (1906-1984), essayist
- Eugène Ehrhart (1906-2000), mathematician
- Armand Walter (1908-1995)
- Robert Schilling (historian) (1913–2004),
- Katia Krafft (1942-1991), volcanologist
- Jean-Baptiste Weckerlin

== Twin towns ==
Guebwiller is twinned with:

- Lucerne (Switzerland)
- Castelfiorentino (Italy)

== Points of interest ==
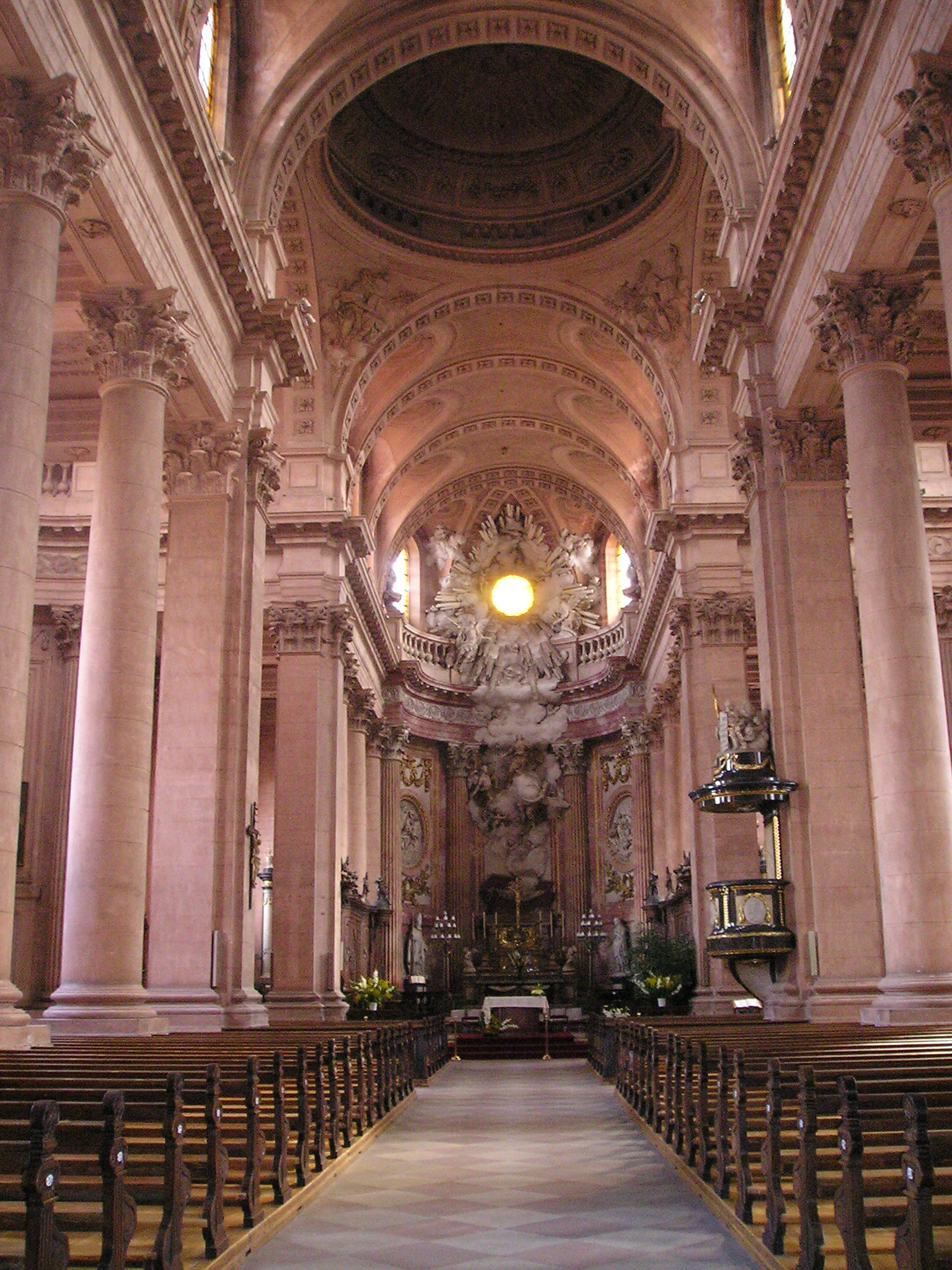
Notre-Dame Church

- Romanesque and early gothic church, Église Saint-Léger
- Gothic former Dominican abbey Les Dominicains, now used as a cultural center.
- Early Renaissance townhall (Hôtel de ville)
- Neoclassical church Église Notre-Dame, the largest Neoclassical church in Alsace
- Musée Théodore Deck et des pays du Florival, the largest museum in Haut-Rhin outside Colmar and Mulhouse
- Parc de la Marseillaise
- Synagogue of Guebwiller

== See also ==
- Communes of the Haut-Rhin département
