= Notre-Dame de Guebwiller =

Église Notre-Dame de Guebwiller
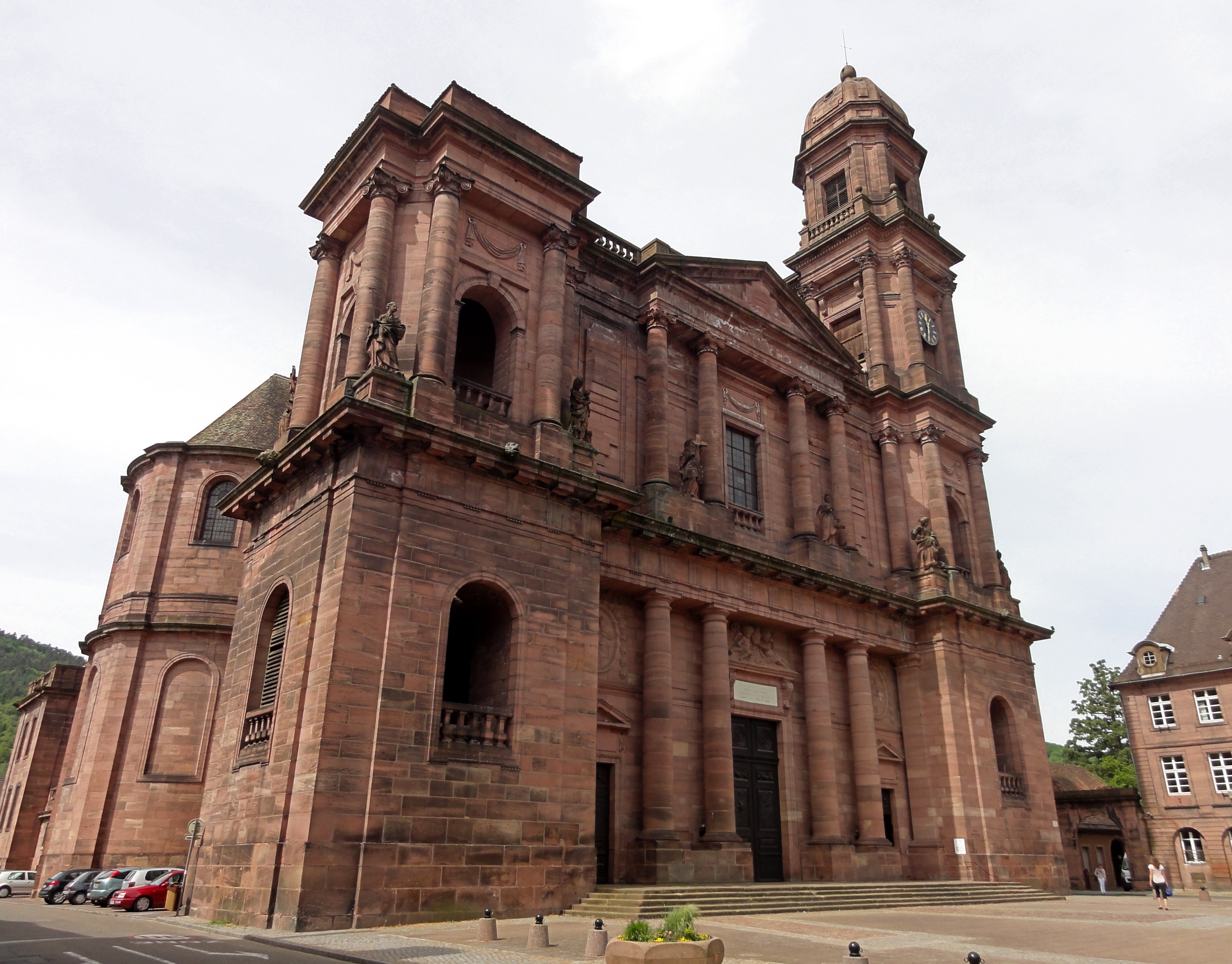
- Église Notre-Dame de Guebwiller
- 47°54′21″N 7°12′53″E
- Location: Guebwiller
- Country: France
- Denomination: Catholic
- Website: https://www.paroisses-catholiques-guebwiller.fr/

History
- Former name: Liebfrauenkirche zu Gebweiler
- Status: parish church
- Dedication: Mary, mother of Jesus

Architecture
- Functional status: collegiate church
- Heritage designation: Monument historique
- Designated: 1841
- Architect(s): Louis Beuque; Gabriel Ignaz Ritter
- Architectural type: basilica
- Style: Neoclassical
- Groundbreaking: 1762
- Completed: 1785

Specifications
- Length: 71 metres (233 ft)
- Width: 41 metres (135 ft)
- Materials: sandstone

Administration
- Archdiocese: Archdiocese of Strasbourg
- Parish: Communauté de Paroisses St-André Bauer

Notre-Dame (Church of Our Lady) is a Neoclassical Catholic parish church in the town of Guebwiller, in the Haut-Rhin department of France. The church is classified as a monument historique by the French Ministry of Culture since 1841. The building is remarkable for its size and for the quality of its decoration; it is considered as the most important Neoclassical church in Alsace, and as an outstanding and most sumptuous example of early Neoclassical architecture.

== History ==
The Benedictines of the ancient and powerful but remote Murbach Abbey in a valley nearby had asked for papal permission to relocate in the town of Guebwiller since 1725, but that permission was only granted by Pope Clement XIII in 1759. They settled near the residence of the bishop, a Baroque palace built by Peter Thumb in 1715, and proceeded to erect a number of stately buildings on an area of seven hectares in the south-east of the town. The grand new collegiate church was to be the centre of this "city within the city" but the whole enterprise was cut short by the French Revolution (the remaining complex of buildings still forms a large and coherent whole).

Notre-Dame was designed by Louis Beuque (1720–1797) from Besançon, a pupil of Jacques-François Blondel. Designs submitted by the engineer and architect Jean Querret (1703–1788) in 1759 had previously been rejected, and Beuque's first submission in 1760 was also deemed "not modern enough". Beuque's second design was accepted in 1761 and work on the church started the following year.
Work was carried on with several interruptions, and Beuque was fired in 1769. He was replaced by the sculptor and architect Gabriel Ignaz Ritter (1732–1813), who modified some aspects of Beuque's design both on the outside and on the inside. The church was inaugurated (after several new delays) on 7 September 1785 by Franz Joseph Sigismund von Roggenbach, the bishop of Basel. At that point, the two planned steeples of the facade had not yet been built. In 1844, the north tower was added in a matching design; the south tower was never built.

== Description ==
Type-wise, Notre-Dame de Guebwiller is a basilica. Unlike most other churches, its monumental facade faces east, not west; this has to do with the configuration of the town at a time when the ramparts still stood. The semi-circular apse on the inside is concealed on the outside by an additional set of walls containing the sacristy, the chapter house and the archive; this accounts for the stern, block-like rear end of the sanctuary. The allegorical statues of the facade are the works of Gabriel Ignaz Ritter.

The spacious and imposing interior is decorated with statues and reliefs, including the wooden choir stalls and the 17 m (56 ft) high reredos, by Ritter and Fidelis Sporrer (1731–1811), made between 1780 and 1788. A pair of 1833 statues by Sporrer's son Joseph replace works that had been destroyed during the French Revolution. Some paintings in the church are the work of the noted painters from Strasbourg, the sisters Monique Daniche (1736–1824) and Ursule Daniche (1741–1822). The pipe organ is a 1908 instrument in a colossal, Neoclassical 1785 organ case.

The total length of the church (including the steps) is 71 m (233 ft). The inside length is 60 m (200 ft). The nave is 24 m (79 ft) wide and the transept is 34 m (112 ft) wide (inside). The maximal exterior width is 41 m (135 ft). The vaults culminate at 28 m (92 ft).

== Gallery ==
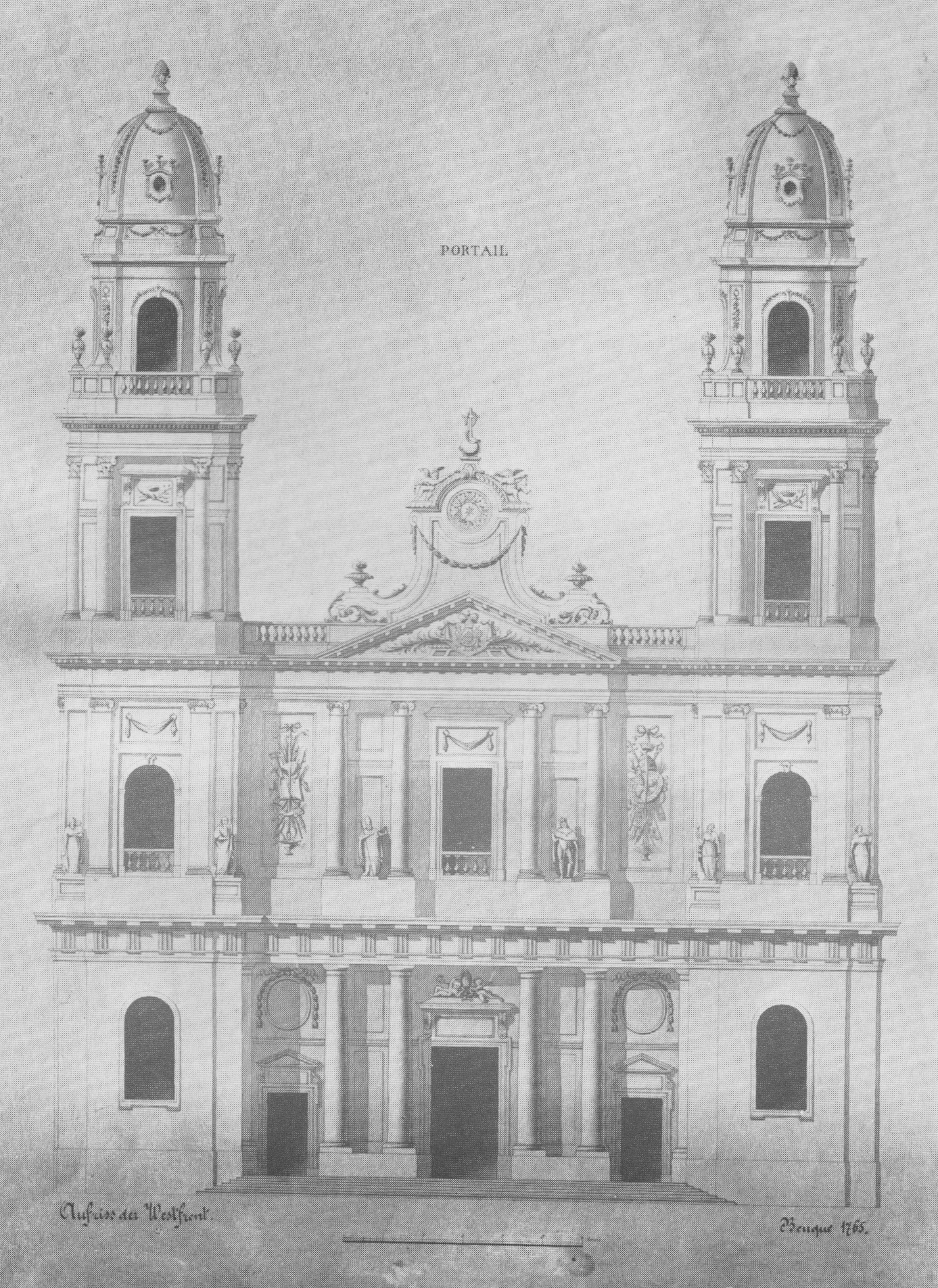
Design by Louis Beuque (1765)

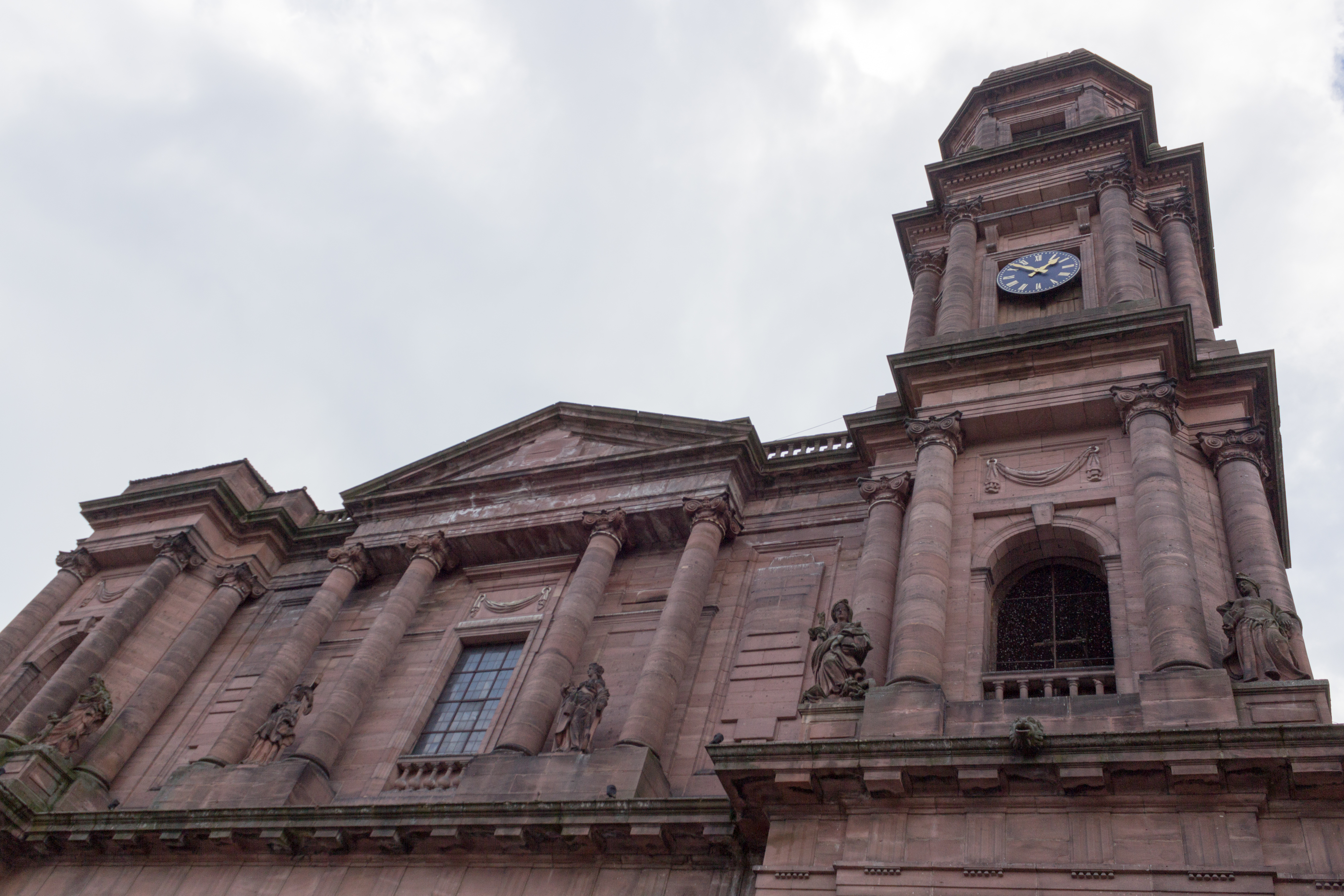
Upper part of the front

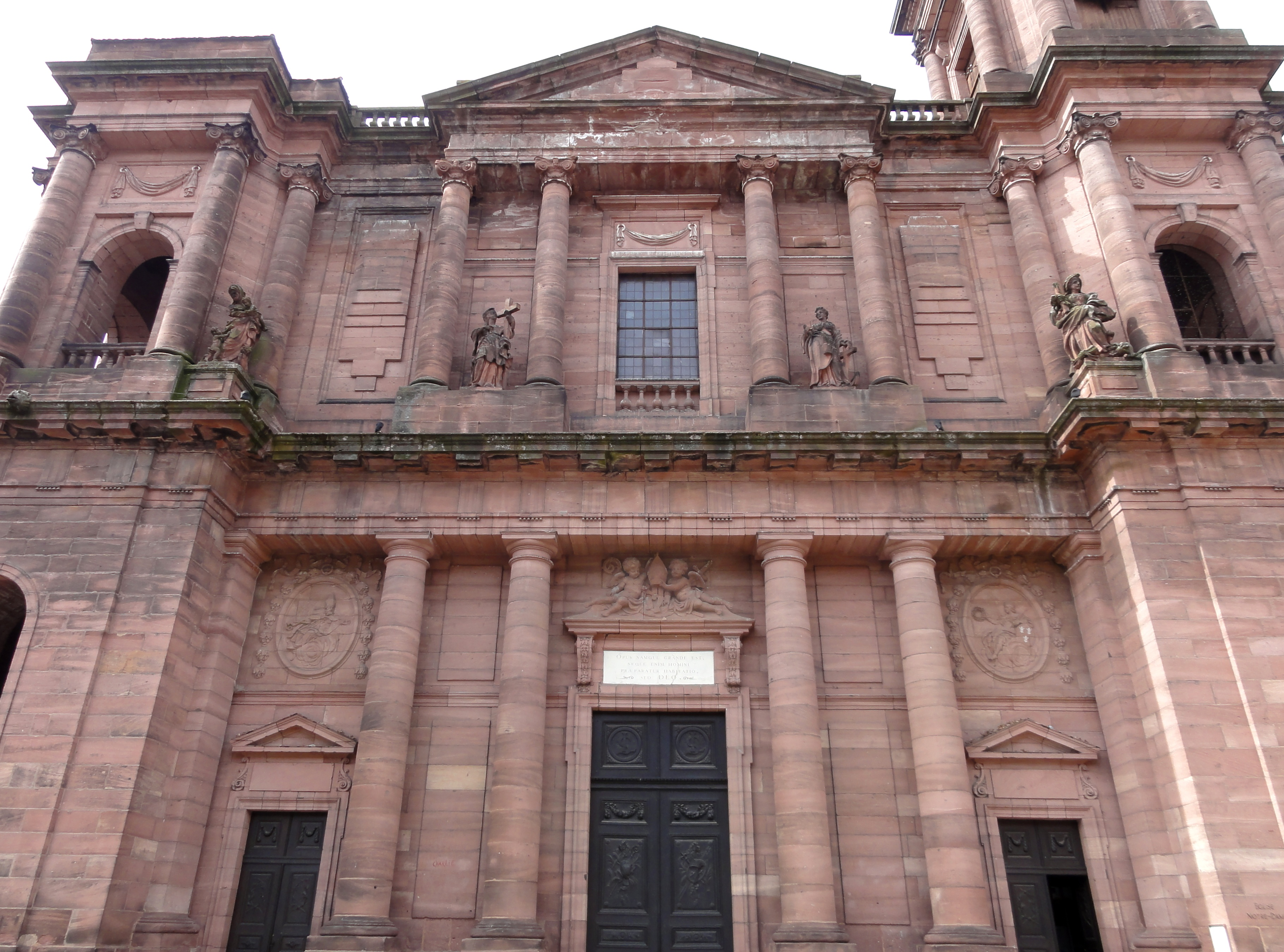
Close-up of the facade

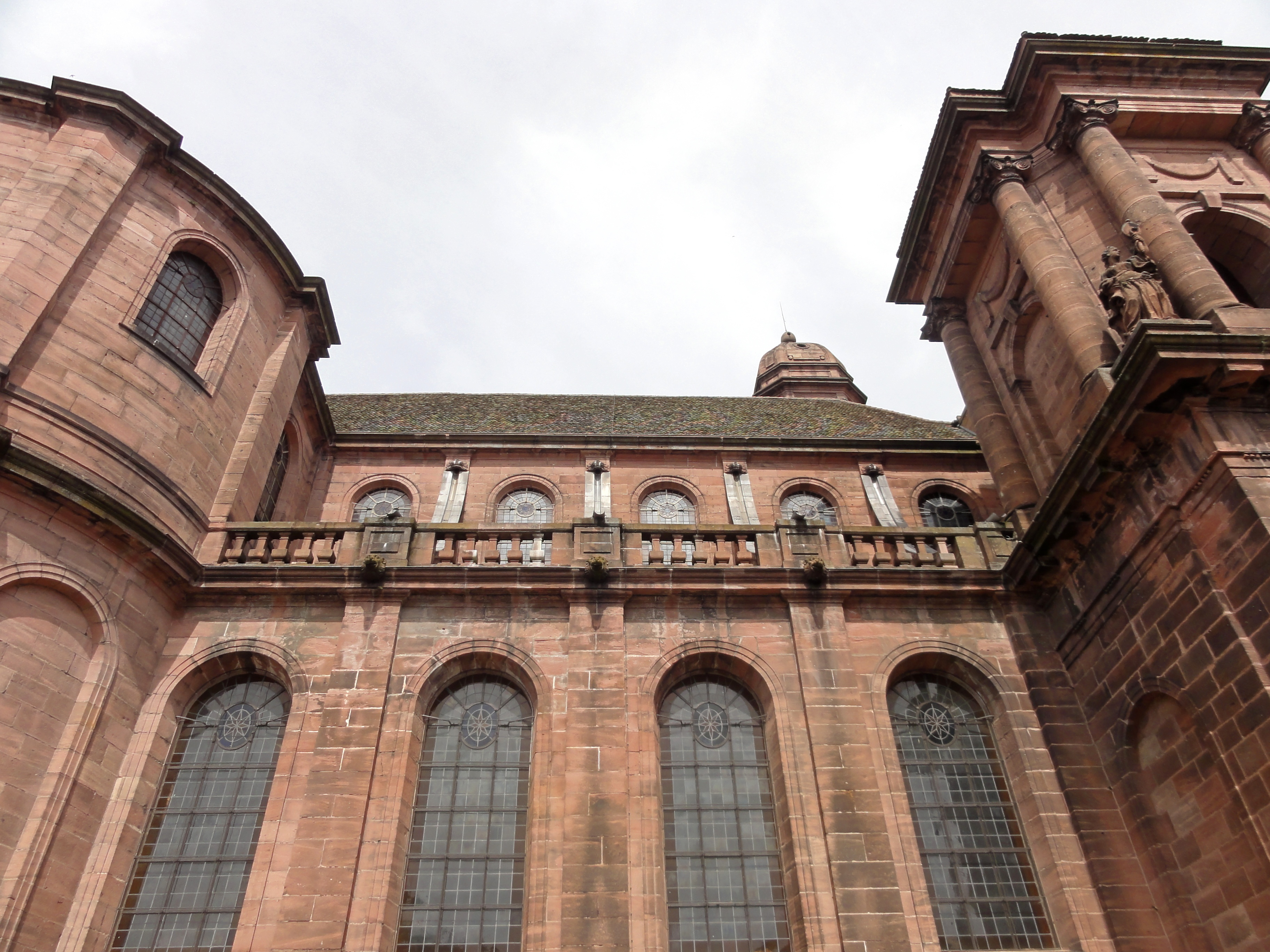
South side

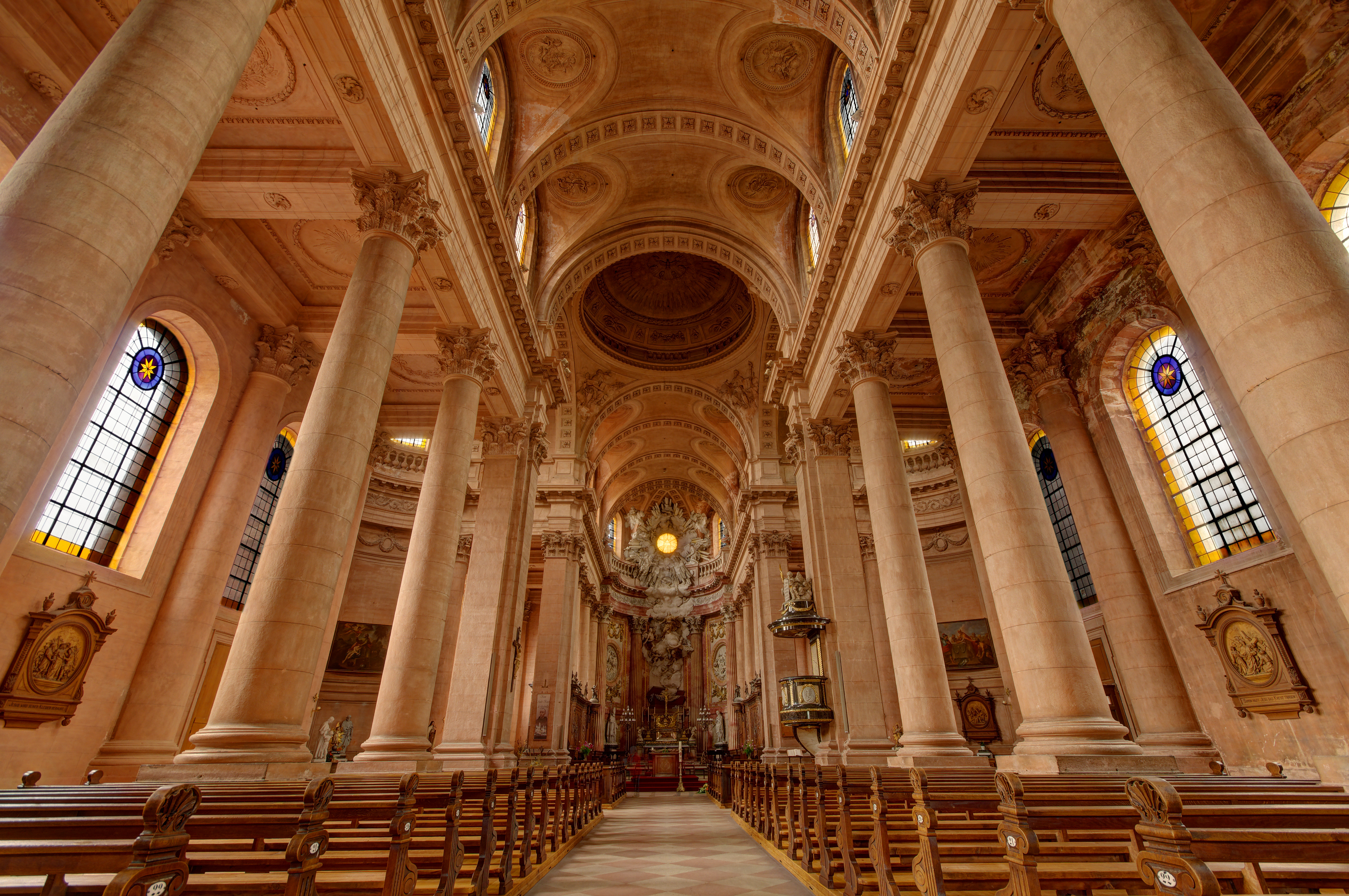
Inside, looking towards the choir

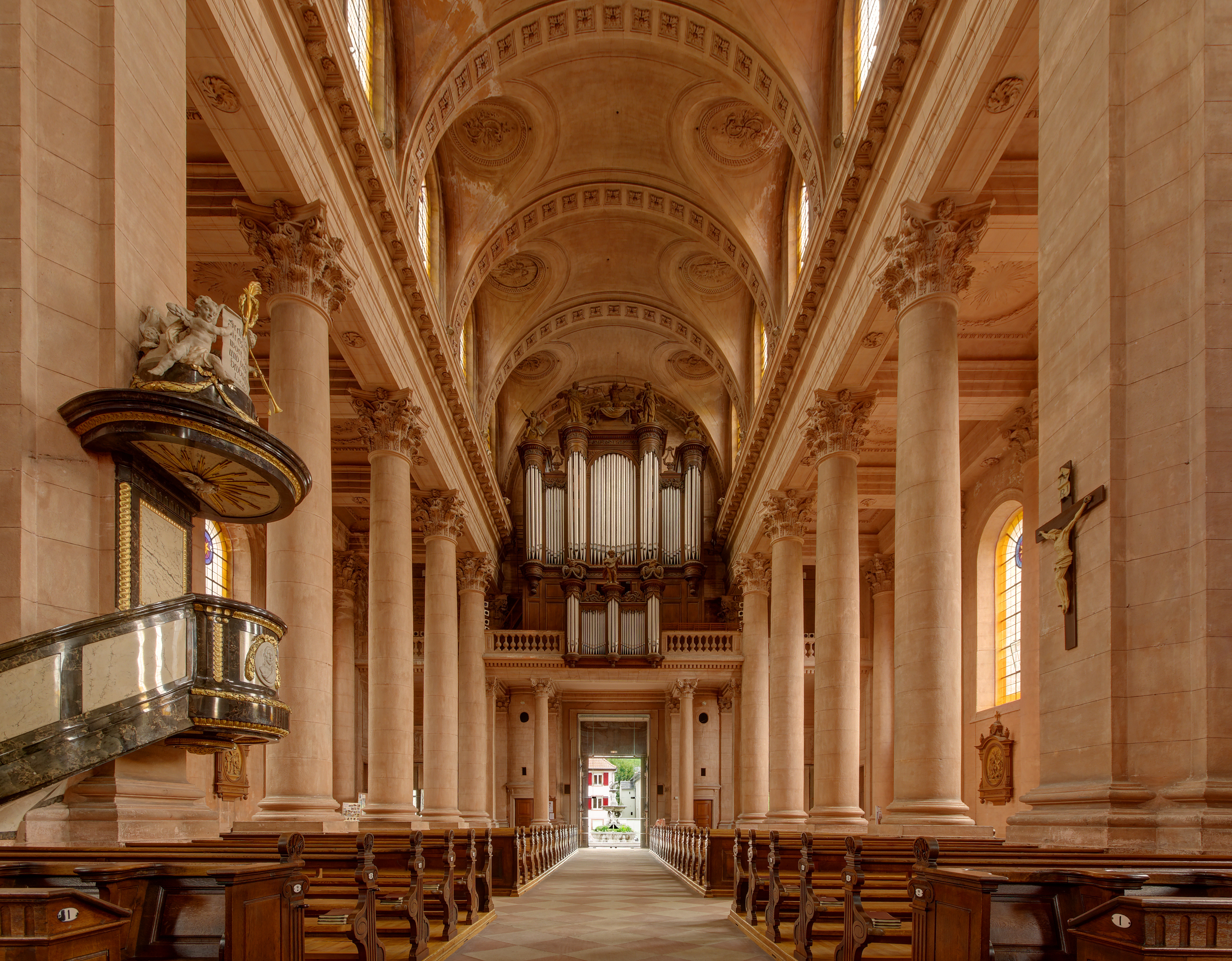
Inside, looking towards the entrance

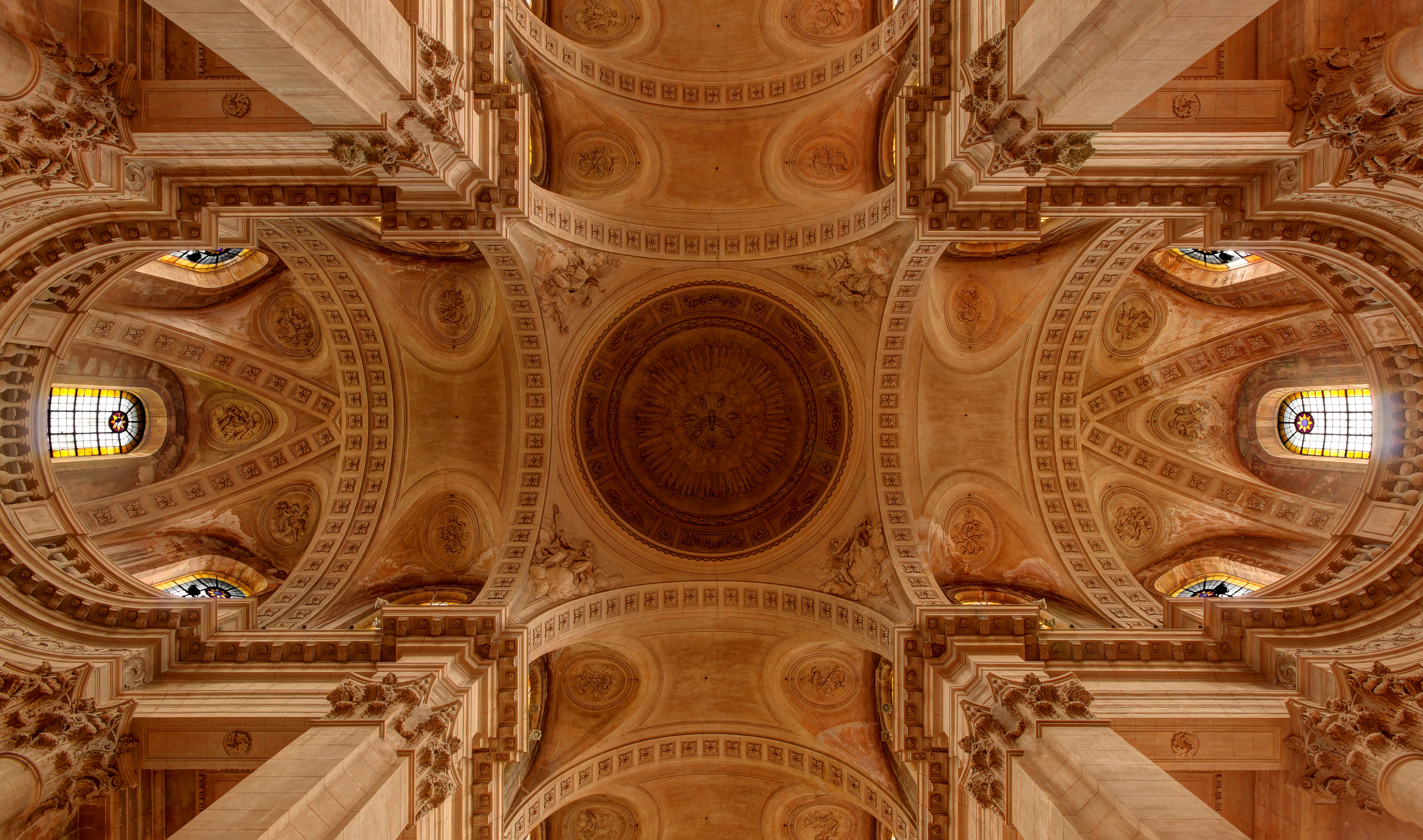
The vaults of the transept

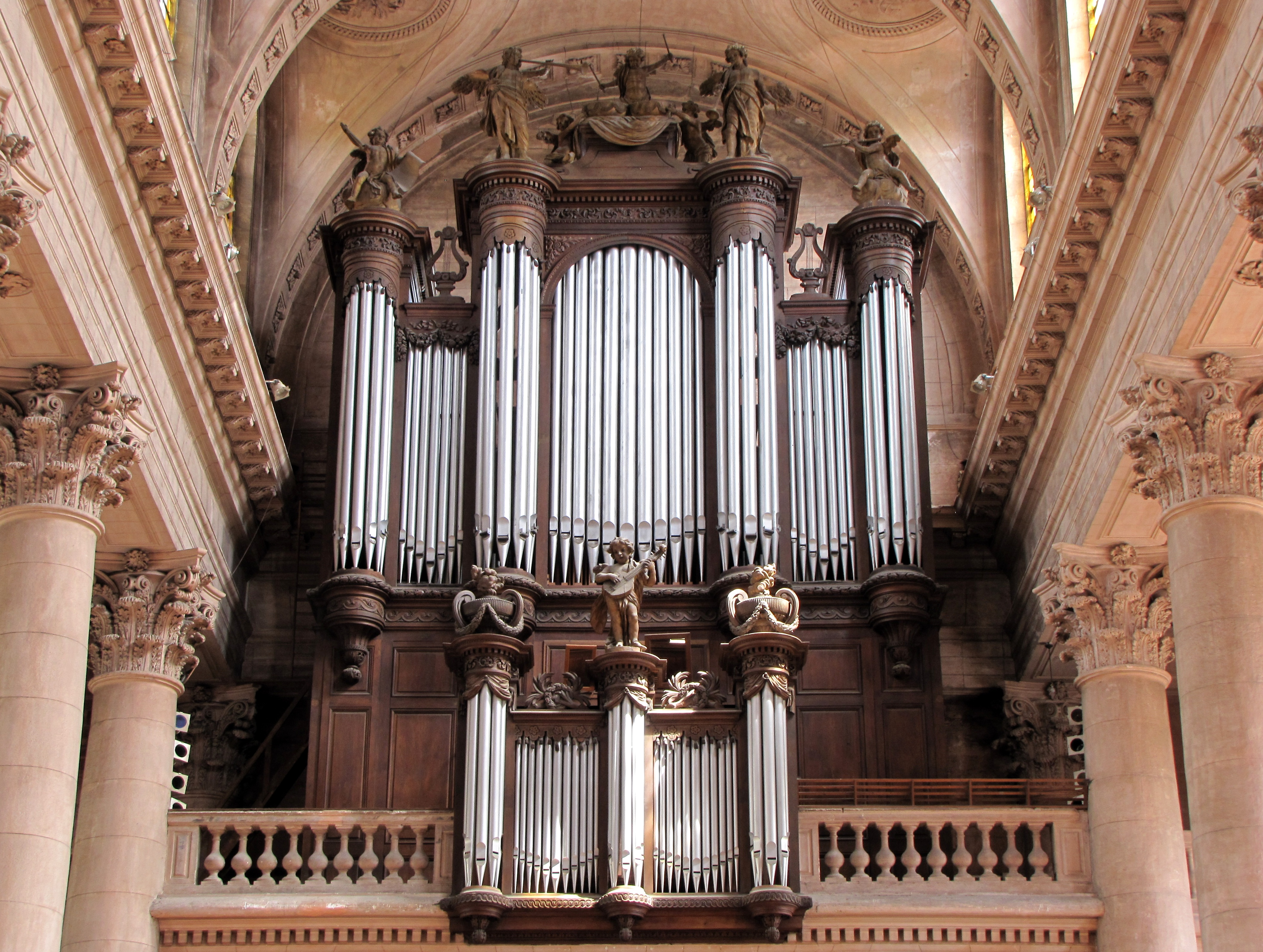
The pipe organ

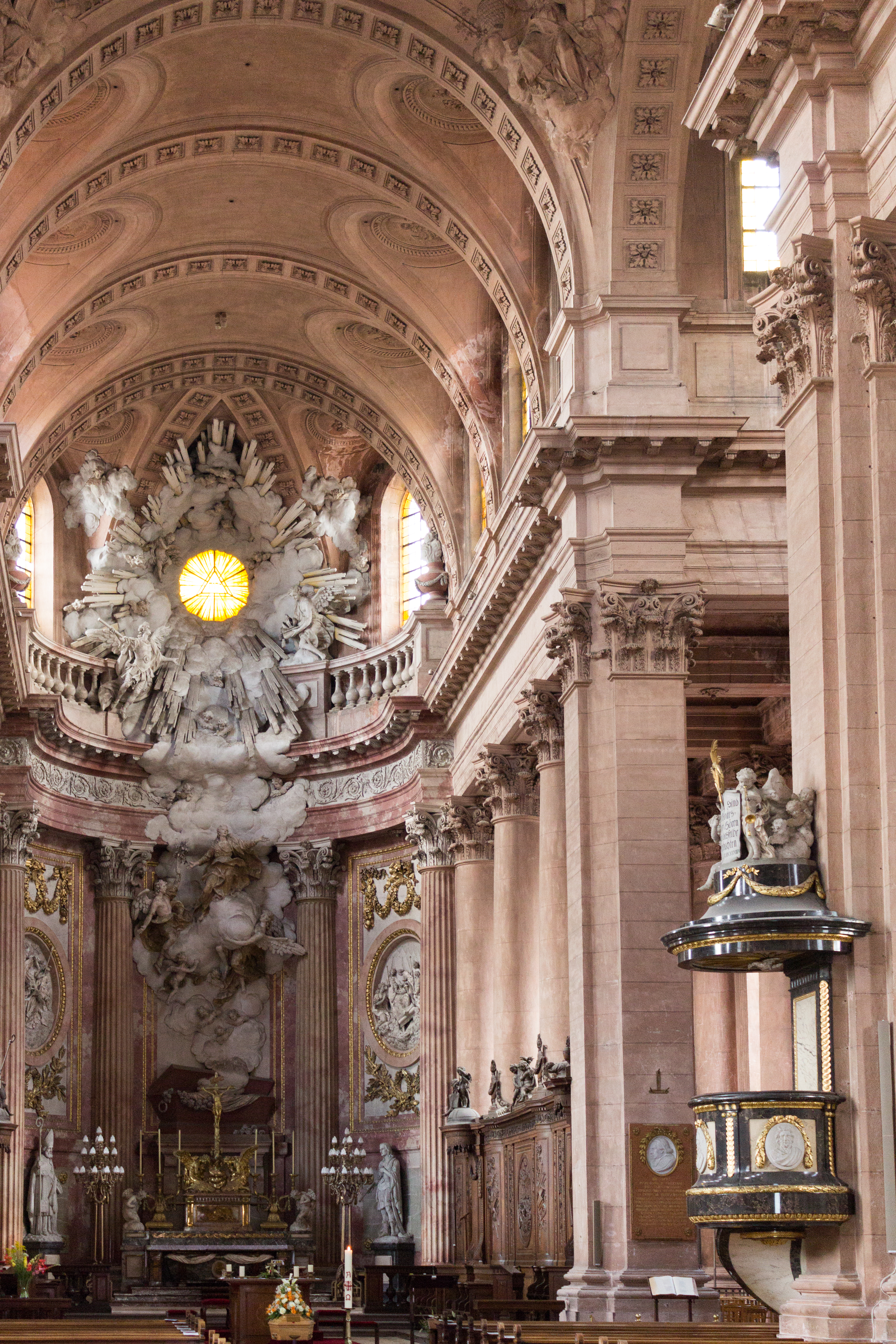
Pulpit and choir

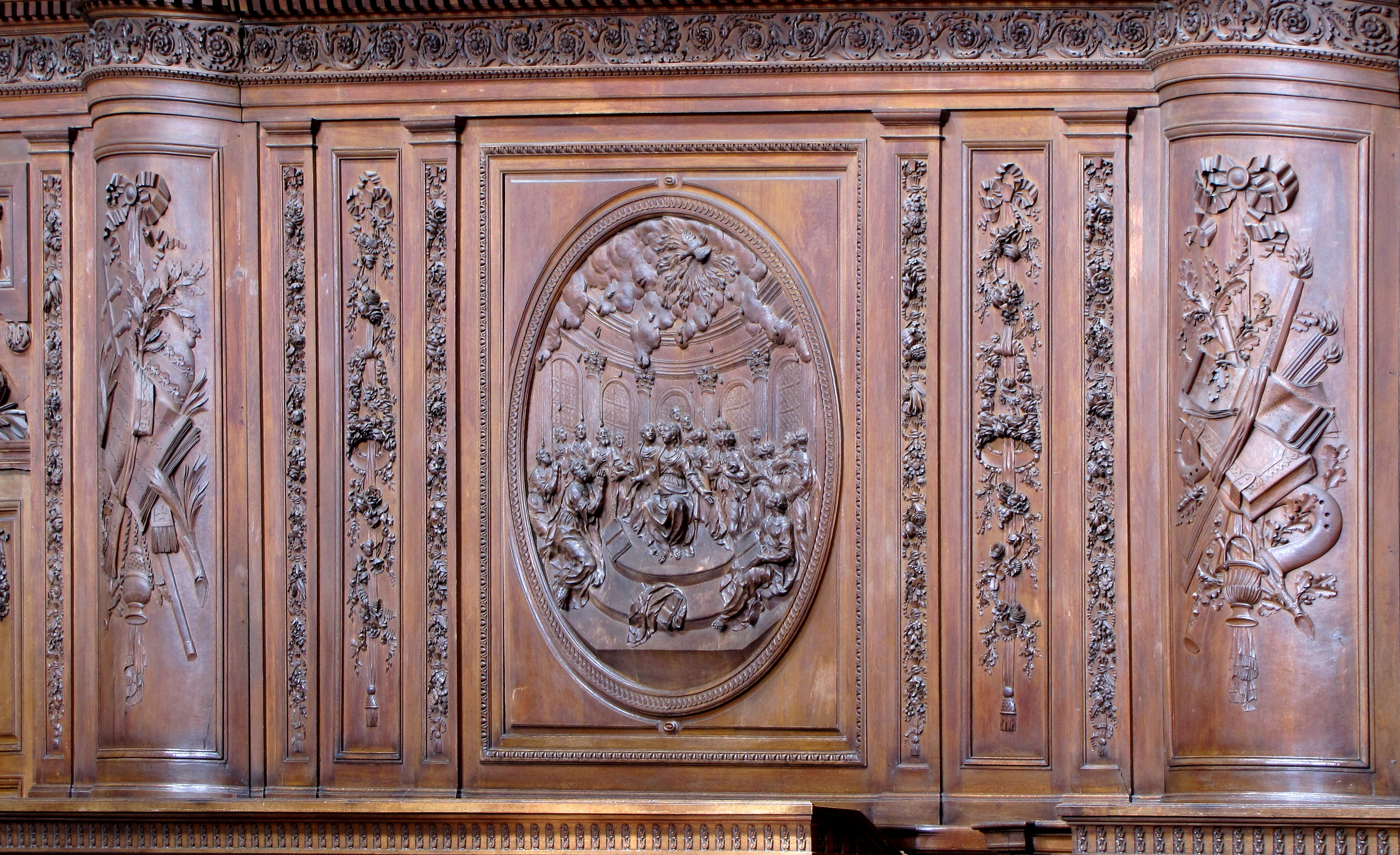
Detail of the choir stalls
