= Umberto Colombo (scientist) =

Italian chemical engineer, academic and minister (1927–2006)

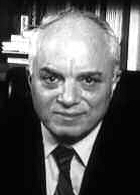
- Born: 1927
- Died: 13 May 2006 (aged 78–79); Rome
- Citizenship: Italy
- Education: University of Pavia
- Awards: Conrad Schlumberger Award (1958); Honda award for ecotechnology (1984)
- Scientific career
- Fields: Chemical Engineering; Physical Chemistry
- Workplaces: University of Milan

Umberto Colombo (1927 – 13 May 2006) was an Italian chemical engineer, academic and the minister of universities, science and technology of Italy.

== Early life and education ==
Colombo was born in 1927. He received a PhD in physical chemistry from the University of Pavia. He was a Fulbright Fellow at the Massachusetts Institute of Technology in the United States.

== Career ==
Colombo trained as a chemical engineer and worked as a professor at the University of Milan in the 1970s. He served as the president of the Italian energy firm Eni for a short period from November 1982 to January 1983 before being appointed as the head of the Italian nuclear energy unit.

From 1993 to 1994 Colombo served as the minister of universities, science and technology in the Ciampi cabinet. Following this he became a member of the Italian national council of economy and labour. He was one of the shareholders of Energy Conversion Devices and became a member of its board of directors in July 1995 before retiring in November 2004.

Other posts that Colombo held included the chairman of ENEA (Italian national agency for new technology, energy and the environment; 1983-1993), president of the European Science Foundation (1991-1993), chairman of the Italian hydrocarbons trust, director general of Montedision's R&D and strategic planning, director of Montecatini's G. Donegani research centre, governor of the international development research centre (IDRC; 1985-1990) in Canada, chairman of the United Nations's advisory committee on science and technology for development (1984-1986), chairman of LEAD-Europe, and president of the European institute research management association. He was also a member of the Club of Rome's executive committee that had been founded by Aurelio Peccei.

=== Works ===
In 1989, Colombo and fellow Italian scientist Francesco Scaramuzzi experimented with nuclear fusion, reporting that they had successfully created nuclear fusion at room temperature.

=== Awards ===
Colombo was the recipient of the Honda Foundation's award for ecotechnology in 1984. He was also awarded China's state international scientific and technological cooperation award in 1999.

== Death ==
Colombo died in Rome on 13 May 2006, aged 78.
