= Henri George Doll =

French-America scientist (1902–1991)

Henri George Doll (13 August 1902 in Paris – 25 July 1991 in Montfort-l'Amaury, France) was a French-American geologist.

== Biography ==
Doll was a leading figure in the development of oil-well logging and a key technical leader of the Schlumberger oilfield services company. A graduate of the École Polytechnique and École des Mines, he married Anne Gruner Schlumberger, daughter of one of the Schlumberger brothers (Conrad Schlumberger), and joined their company.

His contributions include the induction-logging technique, and during World War II he led the development of the jeep-borne mine detector. He received a Certificate of Appreciation from the United States government, and was made an officer of the Légion d'honneur.

Upon his retirement in 1967, the Schlumberger Well Surveying Corporation's research laboratory in Ridgefield, Connecticut, was renamed the Schlumberger-Doll Research Center in his honor. The Schlumberger-Doll Research Center was relocated to Cambridge, Massachusetts, in 2006. (Schlumberger-Doll Research Center, Schlumberger)

Doll came to the United States in 1941 and became an American citizen in 1962. His marriage with Annette Schlumberger ended in divorce. His second wife was the ballerina Eugenia Delarova, who was once married to the choreographer Léonide Massine.
