= Reinhard Bortfeld =

German geophysicist (1927–2019)

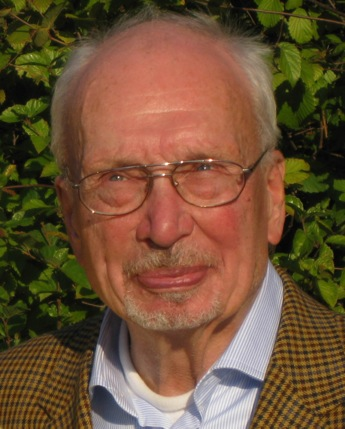
- Bortfeld in 2007
- Born: 25 February 1927; Belgern
- Died: 10 July 2019 (aged 92); Hannover
- Education: University of Göttingen
- Known for: Bortfeld approximation; geometrical ray theory
- Awards: Conrad Schlumberger Award (1960); Reginald Fessenden Award (1989)
- Scientific career
- Fields: Geophysics
- Workplaces: Mobil Oil A.G.; Prakla-Seismos; Royal Dutch Shell; Clausthal University of Technology

Reinhard Bortfeld (25 February 1927 – 10 July 2019) was a German geophysicist.

== Life ==
Bortfeld grew up in Annaburg in Saxony-Anhalt, Germany. After World War II he came to Göttingen where he studied Mathematics, graduated with a Staatsexamen in 1950, and completed his Ph.D. in 1951. He worked for many years as a geophysicist in the industry: from 1952 until 1962 at Mobil Oil A.G. in Celle, then until 1975 at Prakla-Seismos in Hannover, and finally until 1980 at Royal Dutch Shell in The Hague, Netherlands. In 1980 he became a full professor and director of the Institute of Geophysics at the Clausthal University of Technology, Germany. He retired and became professor emeritus in 1992. In 1960 Bortfeld married Monika Bortfeld, with whom he has a son, Thomas, and a daughter, Julia.

== Work in geophysics ==
With his mathematical approach to solve problems of exploration geophysics, Bortfeld has had long lasting impact, in particular on the field of reflection seismology. He is primarily known for the Bortfeld approximation of the Zöppritz equations, which facilitated a physical interpretation of the reflection coefficients of seismic waves. He has been considered as the father of the amplitude versus offset method, which, after further developments, has played a crucial role for the detection of economically useful geological deposits. Heading the data processing center at Prakla-Seismos, he advanced the use of computers in exploration geophysics. During his tenure at the Clausthal University of Technology, he was in charge of processing the data for the German continental seismic reflection program (DEKORP). He also worked on the application of geometrical optics to seismic systems. This work inspired further developments by subsequent generations of geophysicists. Bortfeld was awarded the Conrad Schlumberger Award in 1960 and the Reginald Fessenden Award in 1989.

== Selected publications ==
- Bortfeld, R. (1961). "Approximations to the Reflection and Transmission Coefficients of Plane Longitudinal and Transverse Waves". Geophysical Prospecting. 9 (4): 485–502. Bibcode:1961GeopP...9..485B. doi:10.1111/j.1365-2478.1961.tb01670.x.
- Bortfeld, R. (1989). "Geometrical ray theory: Rays and traveltimes in seismic systems (second-order approximations of the traveltimes)". Geophysics. 54 (3): 342–349. Bibcode:1989Geop...54..342B. doi:10.1190/1.1442659.
- R. Meissner and R.K. Bortfeld. DEKORP–Atlas. Results of Deutsches Kontinentales Reflexionsseismisches Programm, Springer, Berlin-Heidelberg, 1990.
