= Nigel Anstey =

British geophysicist (born 1927)

- Born: Nigel Allister Gustave Anstey; 5 September 1927 (age 99); Bristol, Gloucestershire, England
- Occupation: Geophysicist
- Relatives: Tom Felton (grandson)

Nigel Allister Gustave Anstey (born 5 September 1927) is a British geophysicist who has contributed to seismic exploration. He is the holder of over 50 multinational patents. He is best known by many geoscientists for distilling the geophysical concepts of the seismic method into non-mathematical teachings for seismic interpreters.

Anstey's work in seismic exploration has spanned seven decades. Upon graduation from the University of Bristol in 1948, he joined Seismograph Service Ltd. (SSL) and spent five years in the Middle East and the West Indies as an observer on a seismic crew. In 1953, he returned to the UK as a research geophysicist. He wrote a number of seminal papers while at SSL. In 1968, he established the European offices of Seiscom Delta. In 1975, he left the company to focus on teaching and consulting. He has written many books, monographs, and journal articles, as well as being a Distinguished Lecturer for the SEG. The Nigel Anstey Award for Best Paper in "First Break", the flagship journal of the European Association of Geoscientists and Engineers, is named in his honour. He is still an active contributor to the field of seismic exploration.

Anstey is the grandfather of actor Tom Felton and played a minor role as a background teacher alongside him in the film Harry Potter and the Philosopher's Stone (2001).

== Early life ==
Nigel Allister Gustave Anstey was born on 5 September 1927 in Bristol, Gloucestershire.

== Major contributions (selected) ==
In the 1950s, he began making major contributions to the seismic exploration, which are foundations for the standard techniques used today. He and his colleagues at SSL pioneered the used of cross-correlated seismic sections. His 1957 paper, "Why all this interest in the shape of the pulse?" sparked research on the seismic wavelet (still an active area of research). In 1959, he published the first paper on the earth's effect on the seismic waveform and its relationship to peg-leg multiples.

In 1961, he co-invented (with W. E. Lerwill) the magnetic correlator, which made practical the Vibroseis method, which today is a standard seismic source for land acquisition.

In 1971, he introduced the use of colour overlays of seismic velocity on the seismic section for distinguishing lithologic differences. The use of attribute overlays is standard practice today. In 1975, he was awarded a patent for the basic VSP (vertical seismic profile).

Since 1975, when Anstey left Seiscom Delta to concentrate on teaching and consulting, he has written a number of books, monographs and papers. Many geophysicists have been introduced to the seismic method and Anstey through his series of educational videos. His contributions have been recognised with many honours.

== Honours ==
- Conrad Schlumberger Award, European Association of Geoscientists and Engineers (EAGE), 1964.
- Virgil Kauffman Gold Medal Award, Society of Exploration Geophysicists (SEG), 1972.
- Matson Award, American Association of Petroleum Geologists (AAPG), 1974.
- Maurice Ewing Medal, SEG, 1977.
- Desiderius Erasmus Award, EAGE, 2014.

== Books ==
- Introduction to Vibroseis, 1961.
- Seismic Prospecting Instruments, Volume 1
- Seismic Interpretation, The Physical Aspects, Prentice Hall, 1977.
- Seismic Exploration for Sandstone Reservoirs, 1980
- Simple Seismics, Kluwer Academic Publishers, 1982.
- Vibroseis, Prentice Hall, 1991.

== Journal publications ==
- Anstey, N., 2005, Attributes in color: the early years: ‘’Recorder’’, 30, no. 3, 12-15.
- Anstey, N.A. and O'Doherty, R.F., 2002, Cycles, layers, and reflections: Part 1: ‘’The Leading Edge’’, 21, no. 1, 44-51.
- Anstey, N.A. and O'Doherty, R.F., 2002, Cycles, layers, and reflections: Part 2: ‘’The Leading Edge’’, 21, no. 2, 152-158.
- Anstey, N. A., 1991, Velocity in thin section: ‘’First Break’’, 09, no. 10, 449-457.
- Anstey, N., 1989, Stack-array discussion continues: ‘’The Leading Edge’’, 08, no. 03, 24-25.
- Anstey, N. A., 1989, Correlation techniques - A review, in Geyer, R. L., Ed., Vibroseis: Soc. of Expl. Geophys., 25-52. (* Reprinted from the Journal of the Canadian Society of Exploration Geophysicists, 2, 55-82)
- Anstey, N. A. and Lerwill, W. E., 1989, Correlation in real time, in Geyer, R. L., Ed., Vibroseis: Soc. of Expl. Geophys., 53-71. (* Reprinted from the Proceedings of the Royal Society, 290, 430-447)
- Anstey, N. A., 1986, Whatever happened to ground-roll : ‘’The Leading Edge’’, 05, no. 03, 40-46.
- Anstey, N., 1986, Field techniques for high resolution: ‘’he Leading Edge’’, 05, no. 04, 26-34. (* Errata in TLE-05-10-0011)
- Anstey, N. A., 1986, Invited address - Dry holes: ‘’First Break’’, 04, no. 11, 9-12.
- Anstey, N. A., 1983, ‘’Resolution - A review’’, 3rd Geophysical Conference, 14: Austr. Soc. Expl. Geophys., 60-62.
- Anstey, N. A., 1980, Resolution, bandwidth, and money, 50th Ann. Internat. Mtg: Soc. of Expl. Geophys., Session:G.3.
- Anstey, N. A., 1973, Presidential address - How do we know we are right: ‘’Geophys. Prosp.’’, Eur. Assn. Geosci. Eng., 21, 407-411.
- Anstey, N. A. and Allen, S. J., 1973, What directions should we set for hydrocarbon exploration: ‘’Geophys. Prosp.’’, Eur. Assn. Geosci. Eng., 21, 412-423.
- O'Doherty, R. F. and Anstey, N. A., 1971, Reflections on amplitudes: Geophys. ‘’Prosp.’’, Eur. Assn. Geosci. Eng., 19, 430-458.
- Anstey, N. A. and Newman, P., 1966, The sectional auto-correlogram and the sectional retro-correlogram: ‘’Geophys. Prosp.’’, Eur. Assn. Geosci. Eng., 14, 389-426.
- Anstey, N. A., 1966, Correlation techniques - A review: ‘’J. Can. Soc. Expl. Geophys.’’, 02, no. 01, 55-86.
- Anstey, N. A., 1965, Wiggles: ‘’J. Can. Soc. Expl. Geophys.’’, 01, no. 01, 13-43.
- Anstey, N. A., 1964, Correlation techniques a review: ‘’Geophys. Prosp.’’, Eur. Assn. Geosci. Eng., 12, 355-382.
- Anstey, N. A., 1960, Attacking the problems of the synthetic seismogram: ‘’Geophys. Prosp.’’, Eur. Assn. Geosci. Eng., 08, 242-259.
- Anstey, N. A., 1958, Why all this interest in the shape of the pulse: ‘’Geophys. Prosp.’’, Eur. Assn. Geosci. Eng., 06, 394-403.
- Anstey, N. A., 1958, A note on the seismic pulse recorded from a mine explosion: ‘’Geophys. Prosp.’’, Eur. Assn. Geosci. Eng., 06, 433-437.
- Anstey, N. A., 1957, Modern technique in seismic reflection recording: ‘’Geophys. Prosp.’’, Eur. Assn. Geosci. Eng., 05, 44-68.
- Anstey, N. A., 1956, Instrumental distortion and the seismic record: ‘’Geophys. Prosp.’’, Eur. Assn. Geosci. Eng., 04, 37-55.
