= Parc de la Marseillaise =

Coordinates: 47°54′15.0″N 7°12′58.0″E

The Parc de la Marseillaise is a public arboretum and botanical garden in the center of the town of Guebwiller, in the department of Haut-Rhin, in the Alsace Region of France. It is classified by the French Ministry of Culture as one of the Notable Gardens of France.

The park was created by landscape designer Édouard André between 1897 and 1899, and contains a large fountain, bandstand, a great variety of trees, rhododendrons and roses, and colorful seasonal flower beds of begonias, dahlias and iris.
