= Synagogue of Guebwiller =

Synagogue in Haut-Rhin, France

- French: Synagogue de Guebwiller
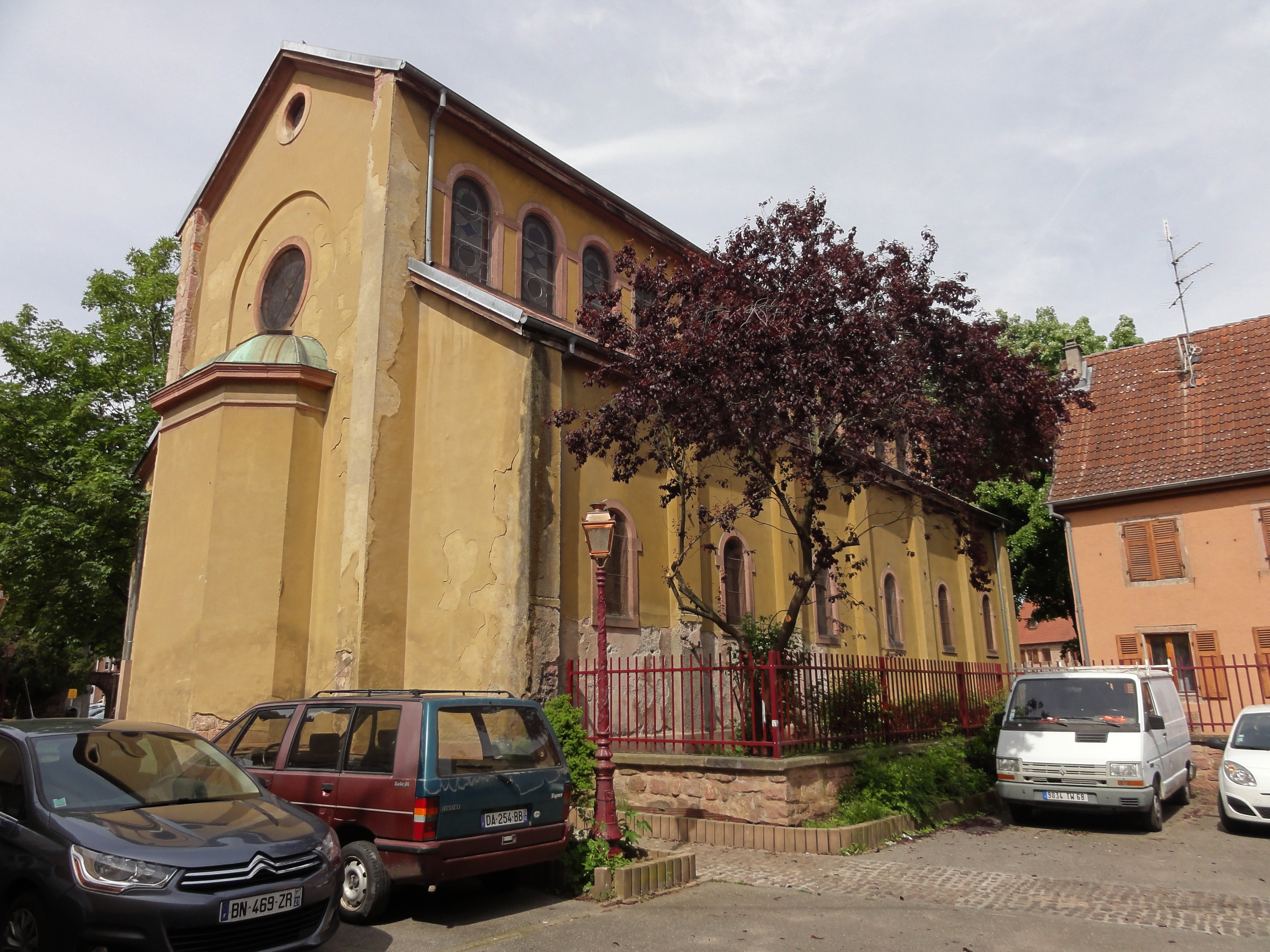
- The synagogue in 2015

- Location of the synagogue in France

Religion
- Affiliation: Judaism
- Ecclesiastical or organizational status: Synagogue
- Status: Active

Location
- Location: 7, rue de l'Ancien-Hôpital, Guebwiller, Haut-Rhin
- Country: France
- Interactive map of Synagogue of Guebwiller
- Coordinates: 47°54′31″N 7°12′39″E

Architecture
- Architect: Auguste Hartmann
- Type: Synagogue architecture
- Style: Romanesque Revival; Byzantine Revival
- Established: c. 1740s (as a congregation)
- Completed: 1872

Monument historique
- Official name: Synagogue
- Type: Base Mérimée
- Designated: July 16, 1984
- Reference no.: PA00085449

The synagogue of Guebwiller (French: Synagogue de Guebwiller) is a Jewish congregation and synagogue, located at 7, rue de l'Ancien-Hôpital, in Guebwiller, Haut-Rhin, France.

== History ==
A synagoga judeorum was mentioned in Guebwiller in 1333. The Jewish community of Guebwiller was wiped out by the 1349 Black Death pandemics. Forty Jews lived in Guebwiller in 1748, and the community developed until 1900. The current synagogue was built in 1872. It replaces an older building from the early 19th century, that had become too small. The synagogue was wrecked by the Nazis in 1940 and restored in 1957.

Guebwiller has been a rabbinate seat since 1910.

Now owned by an association, the synagogue was listed as a monument historique on July 16, 1984.

== Architecture ==
This two-story synagogue was designed by architect Auguste Hartmann in 1869 and built in 1872 in the Romanesque Revival and Byzantine Revival styles. It has a nave, two aisles with six arcades. The nave is flanked with two turrets with pine corn representations. The two lateral walls of the nave have twelve window openings each; each aisle has five. The western portal of the building has red and blue paintings.

A rose is represented on the oculus of the Torah ark.

== See also ==
- History of the Jews in France
- List of synagogues in France
