= Michael Schoenberg =

American theoretical geophysicist (1943–2008)

- Born: December 10, 1939
- Died: August 29, 2008 (aged 68)
- Scientific career
- Fields: Geophysics, Acoustics

Michael Schoenberg (1939–2008) was an American theoretical geophysicist noted for his fundamental contributions to the understanding of anisotropy in the real earth and its application to the determination of texture, fracture porosity, and flow properties of reservoir rocks.

== Career ==
Schoenberg received a Ph.D. in applied mechanics from Columbia University in 1965, and later taught and performed research in theoretical geophysics at the City College of New York, New York University, Tel-Aviv University, and Woods Hole Oceanographic Institution.

He joined Schlumberger Doll Research in Ridgefield, Connecticut, in 1978, where he worked on applications of elastic waves in borehole acoustic logging, vertical seismic profiling, and surface seismic. In 1990, he transferred to the seismic research department of Schlumberger Cambridge Research in Cambridge, U.K. where he worked on the application of surface seismic to characterization of the subsurface.

His 1980 paper on "Elastic wave behavior across linear slip interfaces" in the Journal of the Acoustical Society of America has found wide application in geophysics, the seismic characterization of fractures and fractured reservoirs, materials science and ultrasonic non-destructive testing.

He received the 1997 Conrad Schlumberger Award of the EAGE (European Association of Geoscientists and Engineers) "In recognition of his important contribution to seismic anisotropy, including the investigation of transversely isotropic media. His work leads to a precise determination of faults and fractures, and to a better discrimination of lithology." The Conrad Schlumberger Award is presented to a member of the Association who has made an outstanding contribution over a period of time to the scientific and technical advancement of the geosciences, particularly geophysics. He was the keynote speaker at the 1998 SEGJ International Meeting in Tokyo.

He retired from Schlumberger in 1999, but remained active in research through an international network of collaborators. In 2000–2003 he visited CSIRO Division of Petroleum Resources and Curtin University of Technology in Perth, Western Australia as an advisor to Abnormal Geopressure Prediction Research Program of the Australian Petroleum Cooperative Research Centre (APCRC). During this time he presented a lecture series on "Wave propagation in stratified geomaterials with fractures and anisotropy." Michael Schoenberg died August 29, 2008, after a short illness.

== Selected publications ==
- Schoenberg, M.; 1980, Elastic wave behavior across linear slip interfaces, J. Acoust. Soc. Am., 68, 1516-1521.
- Schoenberg, M., 1983, Reflection of elastic waves from periodically stratified media with interfacial slip: Geophysical Prospecting, 31, 265–292.
- Schoenberg, M.; and Douma, J.; 1988, Elastic wave propagation in media with parallel fractures and aligned cracks, Geophysical Prospecting, 36, 571-590.
- Schoenberg, M.; and Muir, F.; 1989, A calculus for finely layered anisotropic media, Geophysics, 54, 581–589.
- Hood and Schoenberg, 1989; Estimation of vertical fracturing from measured elastic moduli: Journal of Geophysical Research, 94, 15,611–15,618.
- Nichols, D.; Muir, F.; and Schoenberg, M.; 1989, Elastic Properties of rocks with multiple sets of fractures: 63rd Ann. Internat. Mtg., Soc. Expl. Geophys., Expanded Abstracts, 471–474.
- Schoenberg, M.; and J. Protazio; 1992, "Zoeppritz" rationalized and generalized to anisotropy: Journal of Seismic Exploration, 1, 125–144.
- Folstad, P. G. and M. Schoenberg, 1992, Low-frequency propagation through fine layering: SEG Technical Program Expanded Abstracts, 11, 1279–1281.
- Hsu, C.-J., and Schoenberg, M., 1993, Elastic waves through a simulated fractured medium: Geophysics, 58, 964–977.
- Schoenberg, M.; and Sayers, C.M.; 1995, Seismic anisotropy of fractured rock, Geophysics, 60, 204-211.
- Coates, R.T.; and Schoenberg, M.; 1995, "Finite-difference modeling of faults and fractures", Geophysics, 60, 1514-1526.
- Schoenberg, M.; Muir, F.; and Sayers, C.; 1996, "Introducing ANNIE: A simple three-parameter anisotropic velocity model for shales", J. Seis. Expl. vol. 5, 35–49.
- Schoenberg, M.; and Helbig, K.; 1997, Orthorhombic media: Modeling elastic wave behavior in a vertically fractured earth, Geophysics, 62, 1954-1974.
- Haugen, G. U.; and M. A. Schoenberg; 2000, The echo of a fault or fracture: Geophysics, 65, 176–189.
- Liu, E., Vlastos, S., Li, X.-Y., Main, I.G. and Schoenberg, M., 2004, Modelling seismic wave propagation during fluid injection in a fractured network: Effects of changes in pore pressure on seismic waves, The Leading Edge, 23, No. 8, 778-783.
- Vlastos, S., Liu, E., Main, I.G., Schoenberg, M., Maillot, B. and X.Y. Li, 2006, Dual simulation of fluid flow and seismic wave propagation in a fractured network: Effects of changes in pore pressure on seismic signature, Geophysical Journal International, 166, 825-838.
- Daley, T. M., M. A. Schoenberg, J. Rutqvist, and K. T. Nihei, 2006, Fractured reservoirs: An analysis of coupled elastodynamic and permeability changes from pore pressure variation: Geophysics, 71, O33–O41.
- Nakagawa, S. and Schoenberg, M., 2007, Poroelastic modeling of seismic boundary conditions across a fracture: J. Acoust. Soc. Am., 122, 831-847.
