= European Association of Geoscientists and Engineers =

Professional organization for geoscientists and engineers

- Founded: 1951
- Type: Professional organization
- Location: Bunnik, Utrecht, the Netherlands
- Region served: Worldwide
- Method: Events, publications, education
- Members: 19,000
- Employees: 70
- Website: www.eage.org

The European Association of Geoscientists and Engineers (EAGE) is a professional organization for geoscientists and engineers, established in 1951 with a worldwide membership. The association provides a platform for professionals in geophysics, petroleum exploration, geology, reservoir engineering, mining, civil engineering, digitalization and energy transition to exchange ideas and information.

EAGE is headquartered in the Netherlands and has regional offices in Dubai, Kuala Lumpur, and Bogotá. The association is committed to promoting the advancement of geoscience and engineering through various activities, including:

- Conferences, exhibitions, workshops, and webinars: EAGE organizes a large number of events each year, including its flagship event, the EAGE Annual Conference and Exhibition, which attracts nearly 6,000 visitors from around the world.
- Publications: EAGE publishes several journals, books, and magazines, including First Break, Geophysical Prospecting, Near Surface Geophysics, Petroleum Geoscience, Basin Research and Geoenergy.
- Educational programmes: EAGE offers educational programmes, including short courses and lectures, as well as various student programmes. EAGE is an official Continuing Professional Development (CPD) Provider for the "European Geologist" (EurGeol) title, established by European Federation of Geologists.

== Events ==
The largest EAGE event in any year is the EAGE Annual Conference and Exhibition, attracting almost 6,000 visitors from all over the world. The conference covers a wide range of topics in the fields of geoscience, geophysics, and petroleum engineering. The topics include imaging and interpretation of seismic data, modeling and simulation of reservoirs, geology and petrophysics, geomechanics and structural geology, geothermal energy, artificial intelligence and digitalization, environmental impact and HSE issues, and many more. The conference also covers topics such as exploration and production, carbon capture and storage, energy transition, and education in the future. The conference brings together experts in these fields to discuss current trends, future prospects, and best practices in various aspects of the industry.

EAGE also organizes dedicated conferences and workshops on a variety of topics, including exploration for minerals, oil and gas, geothermal energy, as well as emerging areas such as water footprint, hydrogen, carbon capture and storage, and deepwater exploration.

The events also focus on various aspects of geoscience and engineering, including geostatistics, depth imaging, borehole geology, reservoir modeling, rock physics, seismology, and geochemistry as well as special sessions on topics such as women in geoscience and engineering.

Additionally, EAGE hosts events dedicated to the use of new technologies and digitalization in the energy industry, as well as events that bring together young professionals and students in the field.

== Publications ==
EAGE's flagship magazine is First Break. In addition, EAGE publishes five scientific journals: Geophysical Prospecting, Near Surface Geophysics, Petroleum Geoscience, Basin Research and Geoenergy. EAGE also publishes several books per year and maintains an online publishing platform called EarthDoc.

== See also ==
- List of geoscience organizations
- Society of Exploration Geophysicists
- Society of Petroleum Engineers
- American Association of Petroleum Geologists
